

352001–352100 

|-bgcolor=#d6d6d6
| 352001 ||  || — || October 17, 2006 || Catalina || CSS || — || align=right | 2.7 km || 
|-id=002 bgcolor=#d6d6d6
| 352002 ||  || — || October 20, 2006 || Palomar || NEAT || HYG || align=right | 2.9 km || 
|-id=003 bgcolor=#d6d6d6
| 352003 ||  || — || October 27, 2006 || Mount Lemmon || Mount Lemmon Survey || — || align=right | 2.0 km || 
|-id=004 bgcolor=#d6d6d6
| 352004 ||  || — || October 27, 2006 || Mount Lemmon || Mount Lemmon Survey || — || align=right | 2.7 km || 
|-id=005 bgcolor=#d6d6d6
| 352005 ||  || — || October 27, 2006 || Kitt Peak || Spacewatch || — || align=right | 2.9 km || 
|-id=006 bgcolor=#d6d6d6
| 352006 ||  || — || October 29, 2006 || Kitt Peak || Spacewatch || — || align=right | 2.3 km || 
|-id=007 bgcolor=#d6d6d6
| 352007 ||  || — || October 2, 2006 || Mount Lemmon || Mount Lemmon Survey || — || align=right | 3.0 km || 
|-id=008 bgcolor=#d6d6d6
| 352008 ||  || — || October 23, 2006 || Catalina || CSS || URS || align=right | 4.9 km || 
|-id=009 bgcolor=#d6d6d6
| 352009 ||  || — || October 21, 2006 || Apache Point || A. C. Becker || — || align=right | 2.5 km || 
|-id=010 bgcolor=#d6d6d6
| 352010 ||  || — || October 20, 2006 || Kitt Peak || Spacewatch || THM || align=right | 1.9 km || 
|-id=011 bgcolor=#d6d6d6
| 352011 ||  || — || October 16, 2006 || Kitt Peak || Spacewatch || HYG || align=right | 2.3 km || 
|-id=012 bgcolor=#d6d6d6
| 352012 ||  || — || October 22, 2006 || Kitt Peak || Spacewatch || — || align=right | 2.4 km || 
|-id=013 bgcolor=#d6d6d6
| 352013 ||  || — || October 27, 2006 || Catalina || CSS || EOS || align=right | 2.3 km || 
|-id=014 bgcolor=#E9E9E9
| 352014 ||  || — || November 10, 2006 || Kitt Peak || Spacewatch || — || align=right | 2.7 km || 
|-id=015 bgcolor=#d6d6d6
| 352015 ||  || — || November 10, 2006 || Kitt Peak || Spacewatch || — || align=right | 3.0 km || 
|-id=016 bgcolor=#d6d6d6
| 352016 ||  || — || November 10, 2006 || Kitt Peak || Spacewatch || EUP || align=right | 3.9 km || 
|-id=017 bgcolor=#d6d6d6
| 352017 Juvarra ||  ||  || November 12, 2006 || Vallemare di Borbona || V. S. Casulli || — || align=right | 2.7 km || 
|-id=018 bgcolor=#d6d6d6
| 352018 ||  || — || November 9, 2006 || Kitt Peak || Spacewatch || — || align=right | 3.6 km || 
|-id=019 bgcolor=#d6d6d6
| 352019 ||  || — || November 9, 2006 || Kitt Peak || Spacewatch || EOS || align=right | 2.3 km || 
|-id=020 bgcolor=#d6d6d6
| 352020 ||  || — || November 9, 2006 || Kitt Peak || Spacewatch || EOS || align=right | 1.9 km || 
|-id=021 bgcolor=#d6d6d6
| 352021 ||  || — || November 10, 2006 || Kitt Peak || Spacewatch || HYG || align=right | 2.5 km || 
|-id=022 bgcolor=#d6d6d6
| 352022 ||  || — || November 10, 2006 || Kitt Peak || Spacewatch || — || align=right | 3.8 km || 
|-id=023 bgcolor=#d6d6d6
| 352023 ||  || — || September 27, 2006 || Mount Lemmon || Mount Lemmon Survey || THM || align=right | 1.9 km || 
|-id=024 bgcolor=#d6d6d6
| 352024 ||  || — || November 10, 2006 || Kitt Peak || Spacewatch || — || align=right | 3.7 km || 
|-id=025 bgcolor=#d6d6d6
| 352025 ||  || — || November 11, 2006 || Catalina || CSS || — || align=right | 3.6 km || 
|-id=026 bgcolor=#d6d6d6
| 352026 ||  || — || October 12, 2006 || Kitt Peak || Spacewatch || — || align=right | 3.3 km || 
|-id=027 bgcolor=#d6d6d6
| 352027 ||  || — || November 11, 2006 || Kitt Peak || Spacewatch || THM || align=right | 1.9 km || 
|-id=028 bgcolor=#d6d6d6
| 352028 ||  || — || November 11, 2006 || Kitt Peak || Spacewatch || THM || align=right | 1.9 km || 
|-id=029 bgcolor=#d6d6d6
| 352029 ||  || — || November 11, 2006 || Kitt Peak || Spacewatch || EOS || align=right | 1.9 km || 
|-id=030 bgcolor=#d6d6d6
| 352030 ||  || — || October 22, 2006 || Mount Lemmon || Mount Lemmon Survey || MEL || align=right | 4.1 km || 
|-id=031 bgcolor=#d6d6d6
| 352031 ||  || — || November 11, 2006 || Kitt Peak || Spacewatch || THB || align=right | 4.2 km || 
|-id=032 bgcolor=#d6d6d6
| 352032 ||  || — || September 28, 2006 || Mount Lemmon || Mount Lemmon Survey || — || align=right | 2.7 km || 
|-id=033 bgcolor=#d6d6d6
| 352033 ||  || — || November 11, 2006 || Kitt Peak || Spacewatch || — || align=right | 3.8 km || 
|-id=034 bgcolor=#d6d6d6
| 352034 ||  || — || November 11, 2006 || Mount Lemmon || Mount Lemmon Survey || EUP || align=right | 4.3 km || 
|-id=035 bgcolor=#d6d6d6
| 352035 ||  || — || November 12, 2006 || Mount Lemmon || Mount Lemmon Survey || — || align=right | 3.4 km || 
|-id=036 bgcolor=#d6d6d6
| 352036 ||  || — || November 13, 2006 || Kitt Peak || Spacewatch || — || align=right | 3.1 km || 
|-id=037 bgcolor=#d6d6d6
| 352037 ||  || — || November 13, 2006 || Mount Lemmon || Mount Lemmon Survey || EOS || align=right | 2.0 km || 
|-id=038 bgcolor=#d6d6d6
| 352038 ||  || — || November 14, 2006 || Socorro || LINEAR || — || align=right | 3.7 km || 
|-id=039 bgcolor=#d6d6d6
| 352039 ||  || — || November 14, 2006 || Catalina || CSS || — || align=right | 3.4 km || 
|-id=040 bgcolor=#d6d6d6
| 352040 ||  || — || November 14, 2006 || Kitt Peak || Spacewatch || HYG || align=right | 3.0 km || 
|-id=041 bgcolor=#d6d6d6
| 352041 ||  || — || October 23, 2006 || Kitt Peak || Spacewatch || HYG || align=right | 2.2 km || 
|-id=042 bgcolor=#d6d6d6
| 352042 ||  || — || October 31, 2006 || Kitt Peak || Spacewatch || — || align=right | 3.5 km || 
|-id=043 bgcolor=#d6d6d6
| 352043 ||  || — || November 13, 2006 || Kitt Peak || Spacewatch || — || align=right | 2.9 km || 
|-id=044 bgcolor=#d6d6d6
| 352044 ||  || — || November 13, 2006 || Kitt Peak || Spacewatch || 637 || align=right | 3.0 km || 
|-id=045 bgcolor=#d6d6d6
| 352045 ||  || — || November 13, 2006 || Kitt Peak || Spacewatch || LIX || align=right | 3.3 km || 
|-id=046 bgcolor=#d6d6d6
| 352046 ||  || — || November 13, 2006 || Palomar || NEAT || — || align=right | 5.4 km || 
|-id=047 bgcolor=#d6d6d6
| 352047 ||  || — || November 15, 2006 || Socorro || LINEAR || — || align=right | 4.0 km || 
|-id=048 bgcolor=#d6d6d6
| 352048 ||  || — || November 14, 2006 || Socorro || LINEAR || — || align=right | 2.7 km || 
|-id=049 bgcolor=#d6d6d6
| 352049 ||  || — || September 18, 2006 || Catalina || CSS || — || align=right | 3.0 km || 
|-id=050 bgcolor=#d6d6d6
| 352050 ||  || — || November 15, 2006 || Catalina || CSS || — || align=right | 3.6 km || 
|-id=051 bgcolor=#d6d6d6
| 352051 ||  || — || November 9, 2006 || Palomar || NEAT || EOS || align=right | 2.8 km || 
|-id=052 bgcolor=#d6d6d6
| 352052 ||  || — || October 4, 2006 || Mount Lemmon || Mount Lemmon Survey || URS || align=right | 4.8 km || 
|-id=053 bgcolor=#d6d6d6
| 352053 ||  || — || October 19, 2006 || Catalina || CSS || — || align=right | 4.2 km || 
|-id=054 bgcolor=#d6d6d6
| 352054 ||  || — || November 15, 2006 || Catalina || CSS || — || align=right | 3.2 km || 
|-id=055 bgcolor=#d6d6d6
| 352055 ||  || — || November 14, 2006 || Kitt Peak || Spacewatch || — || align=right | 3.2 km || 
|-id=056 bgcolor=#d6d6d6
| 352056 ||  || — || November 2, 2006 || Mount Lemmon || Mount Lemmon Survey || — || align=right | 3.4 km || 
|-id=057 bgcolor=#d6d6d6
| 352057 ||  || — || November 16, 2006 || Kitt Peak || Spacewatch || — || align=right | 2.6 km || 
|-id=058 bgcolor=#d6d6d6
| 352058 ||  || — || November 16, 2006 || Kitt Peak || Spacewatch || HYG || align=right | 2.5 km || 
|-id=059 bgcolor=#d6d6d6
| 352059 ||  || — || November 16, 2006 || Kitt Peak || Spacewatch || — || align=right | 3.9 km || 
|-id=060 bgcolor=#d6d6d6
| 352060 ||  || — || November 16, 2006 || Mount Lemmon || Mount Lemmon Survey || MRC || align=right | 2.9 km || 
|-id=061 bgcolor=#d6d6d6
| 352061 ||  || — || November 16, 2006 || Kitt Peak || Spacewatch || EOS || align=right | 2.5 km || 
|-id=062 bgcolor=#d6d6d6
| 352062 ||  || — || November 16, 2006 || Kitt Peak || Spacewatch || — || align=right | 2.6 km || 
|-id=063 bgcolor=#d6d6d6
| 352063 ||  || — || November 17, 2006 || Kitt Peak || Spacewatch || EMA || align=right | 2.9 km || 
|-id=064 bgcolor=#d6d6d6
| 352064 ||  || — || November 18, 2006 || Kitt Peak || Spacewatch || — || align=right | 2.2 km || 
|-id=065 bgcolor=#d6d6d6
| 352065 ||  || — || November 18, 2006 || Kitt Peak || Spacewatch || — || align=right | 2.9 km || 
|-id=066 bgcolor=#d6d6d6
| 352066 ||  || — || November 18, 2006 || Kitt Peak || Spacewatch || — || align=right | 2.7 km || 
|-id=067 bgcolor=#d6d6d6
| 352067 ||  || — || November 18, 2006 || Kitt Peak || Spacewatch || — || align=right | 2.5 km || 
|-id=068 bgcolor=#d6d6d6
| 352068 ||  || — || November 19, 2006 || Kitt Peak || Spacewatch || fast? || align=right | 2.7 km || 
|-id=069 bgcolor=#d6d6d6
| 352069 ||  || — || October 29, 2006 || Mount Lemmon || Mount Lemmon Survey || — || align=right | 3.5 km || 
|-id=070 bgcolor=#d6d6d6
| 352070 ||  || — || November 19, 2006 || Socorro || LINEAR || EUP || align=right | 6.2 km || 
|-id=071 bgcolor=#d6d6d6
| 352071 ||  || — || November 11, 2006 || Kitt Peak || Spacewatch || — || align=right | 2.8 km || 
|-id=072 bgcolor=#d6d6d6
| 352072 ||  || — || November 19, 2006 || Kitt Peak || Spacewatch || THM || align=right | 2.2 km || 
|-id=073 bgcolor=#d6d6d6
| 352073 ||  || — || November 20, 2006 || Catalina || CSS || — || align=right | 3.4 km || 
|-id=074 bgcolor=#d6d6d6
| 352074 ||  || — || November 20, 2006 || Socorro || LINEAR || — || align=right | 4.9 km || 
|-id=075 bgcolor=#d6d6d6
| 352075 ||  || — || November 26, 2006 || 7300 Observatory || W. K. Y. Yeung || — || align=right | 2.8 km || 
|-id=076 bgcolor=#d6d6d6
| 352076 ||  || — || November 26, 2006 || Jornada || D. S. Dixon || — || align=right | 3.2 km || 
|-id=077 bgcolor=#d6d6d6
| 352077 ||  || — || October 27, 2006 || Mount Lemmon || Mount Lemmon Survey || — || align=right | 2.9 km || 
|-id=078 bgcolor=#d6d6d6
| 352078 ||  || — || November 16, 2006 || Kitt Peak || Spacewatch || — || align=right | 3.0 km || 
|-id=079 bgcolor=#d6d6d6
| 352079 ||  || — || November 21, 2006 || Mount Lemmon || Mount Lemmon Survey || EUP || align=right | 5.5 km || 
|-id=080 bgcolor=#d6d6d6
| 352080 ||  || — || November 11, 2006 || Kitt Peak || Spacewatch || — || align=right | 4.1 km || 
|-id=081 bgcolor=#d6d6d6
| 352081 ||  || — || November 24, 2006 || Kitt Peak || Spacewatch || — || align=right | 3.7 km || 
|-id=082 bgcolor=#d6d6d6
| 352082 ||  || — || November 24, 2006 || Kitt Peak || Spacewatch || — || align=right | 3.4 km || 
|-id=083 bgcolor=#d6d6d6
| 352083 ||  || — || November 27, 2006 || Kitt Peak || Spacewatch || THM || align=right | 2.1 km || 
|-id=084 bgcolor=#d6d6d6
| 352084 ||  || — || November 27, 2006 || Kitt Peak || Spacewatch || — || align=right | 6.1 km || 
|-id=085 bgcolor=#d6d6d6
| 352085 ||  || — || November 16, 2006 || Kitt Peak || Spacewatch || — || align=right | 5.8 km || 
|-id=086 bgcolor=#d6d6d6
| 352086 ||  || — || December 9, 2006 || Kitt Peak || Spacewatch || HYG || align=right | 3.8 km || 
|-id=087 bgcolor=#d6d6d6
| 352087 ||  || — || December 9, 2006 || Kitt Peak || Spacewatch || HYG || align=right | 2.5 km || 
|-id=088 bgcolor=#d6d6d6
| 352088 ||  || — || December 10, 2006 || Kitt Peak || Spacewatch || — || align=right | 3.5 km || 
|-id=089 bgcolor=#d6d6d6
| 352089 ||  || — || December 12, 2006 || Kitt Peak || Spacewatch || — || align=right | 2.8 km || 
|-id=090 bgcolor=#d6d6d6
| 352090 ||  || — || August 7, 2005 || Needville || J. Dellinger || EOS || align=right | 1.9 km || 
|-id=091 bgcolor=#d6d6d6
| 352091 ||  || — || December 12, 2006 || Marly || P. Kocher || LUT || align=right | 5.8 km || 
|-id=092 bgcolor=#d6d6d6
| 352092 ||  || — || December 13, 2006 || Mount Lemmon || Mount Lemmon Survey || — || align=right | 4.9 km || 
|-id=093 bgcolor=#d6d6d6
| 352093 ||  || — || December 9, 2006 || Kitt Peak || Spacewatch || — || align=right | 3.6 km || 
|-id=094 bgcolor=#d6d6d6
| 352094 ||  || — || December 13, 2006 || Catalina || CSS || URS || align=right | 4.6 km || 
|-id=095 bgcolor=#d6d6d6
| 352095 ||  || — || December 13, 2006 || Kitt Peak || Spacewatch || EOS || align=right | 2.2 km || 
|-id=096 bgcolor=#d6d6d6
| 352096 ||  || — || December 21, 2006 || Mount Lemmon || Mount Lemmon Survey || URS || align=right | 4.0 km || 
|-id=097 bgcolor=#d6d6d6
| 352097 ||  || — || December 21, 2006 || Kitt Peak || Spacewatch || — || align=right | 2.8 km || 
|-id=098 bgcolor=#d6d6d6
| 352098 ||  || — || December 22, 2006 || Kitt Peak || Spacewatch || EOS || align=right | 2.4 km || 
|-id=099 bgcolor=#d6d6d6
| 352099 ||  || — || December 21, 2006 || Mount Lemmon || Mount Lemmon Survey || — || align=right | 3.8 km || 
|-id=100 bgcolor=#d6d6d6
| 352100 ||  || — || December 24, 2006 || Kitt Peak || Spacewatch || — || align=right | 4.7 km || 
|}

352101–352200 

|-bgcolor=#d6d6d6
| 352101 ||  || — || January 8, 2007 || Mount Lemmon || Mount Lemmon Survey || — || align=right | 5.4 km || 
|-id=102 bgcolor=#FFC2E0
| 352102 ||  || — || January 13, 2007 || Mauna Kea || D. D. Balam || APOPHA || align=right data-sort-value="0.44" | 440 m || 
|-id=103 bgcolor=#d6d6d6
| 352103 ||  || — || January 10, 2007 || Catalina || CSS || EUP || align=right | 7.0 km || 
|-id=104 bgcolor=#d6d6d6
| 352104 ||  || — || January 17, 2007 || Kitt Peak || Spacewatch || — || align=right | 5.2 km || 
|-id=105 bgcolor=#d6d6d6
| 352105 ||  || — || January 17, 2007 || Palomar || NEAT || — || align=right | 4.2 km || 
|-id=106 bgcolor=#d6d6d6
| 352106 ||  || — || January 17, 2007 || Mount Lemmon || Mount Lemmon Survey || — || align=right | 4.5 km || 
|-id=107 bgcolor=#d6d6d6
| 352107 ||  || — || January 23, 2007 || Socorro || LINEAR || ALA || align=right | 6.1 km || 
|-id=108 bgcolor=#d6d6d6
| 352108 ||  || — || January 24, 2007 || Socorro || LINEAR || Tj (2.96) || align=right | 5.5 km || 
|-id=109 bgcolor=#d6d6d6
| 352109 ||  || — || December 21, 2006 || Kitt Peak || Spacewatch || — || align=right | 4.0 km || 
|-id=110 bgcolor=#fefefe
| 352110 ||  || — || February 6, 2007 || Mount Lemmon || Mount Lemmon Survey || — || align=right | 1.4 km || 
|-id=111 bgcolor=#d6d6d6
| 352111 ||  || — || February 13, 2007 || Mount Lemmon || Mount Lemmon Survey || HYG || align=right | 4.0 km || 
|-id=112 bgcolor=#d6d6d6
| 352112 ||  || — || February 10, 2007 || Catalina || CSS || TIR || align=right | 3.5 km || 
|-id=113 bgcolor=#d6d6d6
| 352113 ||  || — || January 15, 2007 || Anderson Mesa || LONEOS || — || align=right | 4.6 km || 
|-id=114 bgcolor=#d6d6d6
| 352114 ||  || — || February 13, 2007 || Mount Lemmon || Mount Lemmon Survey || — || align=right | 4.9 km || 
|-id=115 bgcolor=#d6d6d6
| 352115 ||  || — || February 17, 2007 || Kitt Peak || Spacewatch || SYL7:4 || align=right | 4.2 km || 
|-id=116 bgcolor=#fefefe
| 352116 ||  || — || February 25, 2007 || Mount Lemmon || Mount Lemmon Survey || — || align=right data-sort-value="0.66" | 660 m || 
|-id=117 bgcolor=#fefefe
| 352117 ||  || — || March 12, 2007 || Kitt Peak || Spacewatch || — || align=right | 1.00 km || 
|-id=118 bgcolor=#fefefe
| 352118 ||  || — || March 12, 2007 || Mount Lemmon || Mount Lemmon Survey || FLO || align=right data-sort-value="0.73" | 730 m || 
|-id=119 bgcolor=#fefefe
| 352119 ||  || — || March 12, 2007 || Kitt Peak || Spacewatch || — || align=right data-sort-value="0.62" | 620 m || 
|-id=120 bgcolor=#d6d6d6
| 352120 ||  || — || March 12, 2007 || Kitt Peak || Spacewatch || — || align=right | 3.8 km || 
|-id=121 bgcolor=#fefefe
| 352121 ||  || — || February 26, 2007 || Mount Lemmon || Mount Lemmon Survey || — || align=right data-sort-value="0.78" | 780 m || 
|-id=122 bgcolor=#fefefe
| 352122 ||  || — || March 13, 2007 || Catalina || CSS || — || align=right | 1.2 km || 
|-id=123 bgcolor=#d6d6d6
| 352123 ||  || — || March 10, 2007 || Catalina || CSS || EUP || align=right | 5.1 km || 
|-id=124 bgcolor=#fefefe
| 352124 ||  || — || March 13, 2007 || Kitt Peak || Spacewatch || V || align=right data-sort-value="0.73" | 730 m || 
|-id=125 bgcolor=#fefefe
| 352125 ||  || — || March 11, 2007 || Kitt Peak || Spacewatch || NYS || align=right | 1.8 km || 
|-id=126 bgcolor=#fefefe
| 352126 ||  || — || March 26, 2007 || Mount Lemmon || Mount Lemmon Survey || — || align=right data-sort-value="0.82" | 820 m || 
|-id=127 bgcolor=#fefefe
| 352127 ||  || — || March 25, 2007 || Mount Lemmon || Mount Lemmon Survey || — || align=right | 1.6 km || 
|-id=128 bgcolor=#fefefe
| 352128 ||  || — || April 14, 2007 || Kitt Peak || Spacewatch || — || align=right data-sort-value="0.93" | 930 m || 
|-id=129 bgcolor=#fefefe
| 352129 ||  || — || December 7, 2005 || Kitt Peak || Spacewatch || FLO || align=right data-sort-value="0.85" | 850 m || 
|-id=130 bgcolor=#fefefe
| 352130 ||  || — || March 11, 2007 || Mount Lemmon || Mount Lemmon Survey || — || align=right data-sort-value="0.81" | 810 m || 
|-id=131 bgcolor=#E9E9E9
| 352131 ||  || — || April 15, 2007 || Catalina || CSS || MAR || align=right | 1.5 km || 
|-id=132 bgcolor=#fefefe
| 352132 ||  || — || April 18, 2007 || Kitt Peak || Spacewatch || — || align=right data-sort-value="0.80" | 800 m || 
|-id=133 bgcolor=#fefefe
| 352133 ||  || — || April 22, 2007 || Kitt Peak || Spacewatch || FLO || align=right data-sort-value="0.67" | 670 m || 
|-id=134 bgcolor=#fefefe
| 352134 ||  || — || April 20, 2007 || Kitt Peak || Spacewatch || V || align=right data-sort-value="0.56" | 560 m || 
|-id=135 bgcolor=#fefefe
| 352135 ||  || — || April 23, 2007 || Kitt Peak || Spacewatch || — || align=right data-sort-value="0.80" | 800 m || 
|-id=136 bgcolor=#fefefe
| 352136 ||  || — || April 23, 2007 || Mount Lemmon || Mount Lemmon Survey || — || align=right data-sort-value="0.77" | 770 m || 
|-id=137 bgcolor=#fefefe
| 352137 ||  || — || April 22, 2007 || Catalina || CSS || — || align=right | 1.2 km || 
|-id=138 bgcolor=#fefefe
| 352138 ||  || — || May 9, 2007 || Mount Lemmon || Mount Lemmon Survey || FLO || align=right data-sort-value="0.65" | 650 m || 
|-id=139 bgcolor=#fefefe
| 352139 ||  || — || May 9, 2007 || Kitt Peak || Spacewatch || — || align=right data-sort-value="0.85" | 850 m || 
|-id=140 bgcolor=#fefefe
| 352140 ||  || — || May 13, 2007 || Mount Lemmon || Mount Lemmon Survey || — || align=right data-sort-value="0.77" | 770 m || 
|-id=141 bgcolor=#fefefe
| 352141 ||  || — || May 11, 2007 || Mount Lemmon || Mount Lemmon Survey || — || align=right data-sort-value="0.91" | 910 m || 
|-id=142 bgcolor=#fefefe
| 352142 ||  || — || June 13, 2007 || Kitt Peak || Spacewatch || — || align=right data-sort-value="0.99" | 990 m || 
|-id=143 bgcolor=#FFC2E0
| 352143 ||  || — || June 15, 2007 || Socorro || LINEAR || AMO +1km || align=right | 1.3 km || 
|-id=144 bgcolor=#fefefe
| 352144 ||  || — || June 21, 2007 || Mount Lemmon || Mount Lemmon Survey || — || align=right data-sort-value="0.69" | 690 m || 
|-id=145 bgcolor=#fefefe
| 352145 ||  || — || June 21, 2007 || Mount Lemmon || Mount Lemmon Survey || — || align=right | 1.1 km || 
|-id=146 bgcolor=#fefefe
| 352146 ||  || — || June 23, 2007 || Siding Spring || SSS || — || align=right | 1.5 km || 
|-id=147 bgcolor=#fefefe
| 352147 ||  || — || July 23, 2007 || Tiki || S. F. Hönig, N. Teamo || MAS || align=right data-sort-value="0.75" | 750 m || 
|-id=148 bgcolor=#E9E9E9
| 352148 Tarcisiozani || 2007 PH ||  || August 4, 2007 || Lumezzane || M. Micheli, G. P. Pizzetti || — || align=right | 1.9 km || 
|-id=149 bgcolor=#fefefe
| 352149 ||  || — || August 7, 2007 || Reedy Creek || J. Broughton || — || align=right | 1.2 km || 
|-id=150 bgcolor=#fefefe
| 352150 ||  || — || August 8, 2007 || Socorro || LINEAR || — || align=right | 1.1 km || 
|-id=151 bgcolor=#E9E9E9
| 352151 ||  || — || August 8, 2007 || Socorro || LINEAR || — || align=right | 1.4 km || 
|-id=152 bgcolor=#E9E9E9
| 352152 ||  || — || August 11, 2007 || Socorro || LINEAR || — || align=right | 2.0 km || 
|-id=153 bgcolor=#E9E9E9
| 352153 ||  || — || August 12, 2007 || Socorro || LINEAR || — || align=right | 2.1 km || 
|-id=154 bgcolor=#fefefe
| 352154 ||  || — || August 9, 2007 || Kitt Peak || Spacewatch || V || align=right data-sort-value="0.69" | 690 m || 
|-id=155 bgcolor=#C2FFFF
| 352155 ||  || — || August 10, 2007 || Kitt Peak || Spacewatch || L4 || align=right | 11 km || 
|-id=156 bgcolor=#E9E9E9
| 352156 ||  || — || August 11, 2007 || Siding Spring || SSS || — || align=right | 1.8 km || 
|-id=157 bgcolor=#E9E9E9
| 352157 ||  || — || August 10, 2007 || Kitt Peak || Spacewatch || — || align=right | 1.2 km || 
|-id=158 bgcolor=#E9E9E9
| 352158 ||  || — || October 1, 2003 || Anderson Mesa || LONEOS || JUN || align=right | 1.3 km || 
|-id=159 bgcolor=#E9E9E9
| 352159 ||  || — || August 23, 2007 || Kitt Peak || Spacewatch || — || align=right | 2.1 km || 
|-id=160 bgcolor=#E9E9E9
| 352160 || 2007 RE || — || September 1, 2007 || Siding Spring || K. Sárneczky, L. Kiss || — || align=right | 1.1 km || 
|-id=161 bgcolor=#E9E9E9
| 352161 ||  || — || September 6, 2007 || Dauban || Chante-Perdrix Obs. || CLO || align=right | 2.5 km || 
|-id=162 bgcolor=#E9E9E9
| 352162 ||  || — || September 12, 2007 || Taunus || E. Schwab, R. Kling || — || align=right | 1.8 km || 
|-id=163 bgcolor=#E9E9E9
| 352163 ||  || — || September 5, 2007 || Lulin Observatory || LUSS || — || align=right | 2.2 km || 
|-id=164 bgcolor=#fefefe
| 352164 ||  || — || September 3, 2007 || Catalina || CSS || V || align=right data-sort-value="0.96" | 960 m || 
|-id=165 bgcolor=#E9E9E9
| 352165 ||  || — || September 3, 2007 || Catalina || CSS || — || align=right | 2.9 km || 
|-id=166 bgcolor=#E9E9E9
| 352166 ||  || — || September 4, 2007 || Catalina || CSS || — || align=right | 1.5 km || 
|-id=167 bgcolor=#E9E9E9
| 352167 ||  || — || September 8, 2007 || Andrushivka || Andrushivka Obs. || — || align=right data-sort-value="0.86" | 860 m || 
|-id=168 bgcolor=#E9E9E9
| 352168 ||  || — || August 9, 2007 || Socorro || LINEAR || — || align=right | 1.2 km || 
|-id=169 bgcolor=#E9E9E9
| 352169 ||  || — || September 9, 2007 || Kitt Peak || Spacewatch || — || align=right | 2.5 km || 
|-id=170 bgcolor=#fefefe
| 352170 ||  || — || September 10, 2007 || Mount Lemmon || Mount Lemmon Survey || — || align=right | 1.0 km || 
|-id=171 bgcolor=#fefefe
| 352171 ||  || — || September 10, 2007 || Mount Lemmon || Mount Lemmon Survey || MAS || align=right data-sort-value="0.62" | 620 m || 
|-id=172 bgcolor=#E9E9E9
| 352172 ||  || — || September 10, 2007 || Mount Lemmon || Mount Lemmon Survey || — || align=right | 1.1 km || 
|-id=173 bgcolor=#E9E9E9
| 352173 ||  || — || September 10, 2007 || Catalina || CSS || JUN || align=right | 1.2 km || 
|-id=174 bgcolor=#E9E9E9
| 352174 ||  || — || September 10, 2007 || Mount Lemmon || Mount Lemmon Survey || — || align=right | 1.4 km || 
|-id=175 bgcolor=#E9E9E9
| 352175 ||  || — || September 10, 2007 || Kitt Peak || Spacewatch || — || align=right | 2.6 km || 
|-id=176 bgcolor=#E9E9E9
| 352176 ||  || — || September 11, 2007 || Kitt Peak || Spacewatch || WIT || align=right | 1.2 km || 
|-id=177 bgcolor=#E9E9E9
| 352177 ||  || — || September 11, 2007 || Mount Lemmon || Mount Lemmon Survey || ADE || align=right | 2.8 km || 
|-id=178 bgcolor=#E9E9E9
| 352178 ||  || — || September 12, 2007 || Kitt Peak || Spacewatch || — || align=right | 1.1 km || 
|-id=179 bgcolor=#E9E9E9
| 352179 ||  || — || September 15, 2007 || Antares || ARO || — || align=right | 2.1 km || 
|-id=180 bgcolor=#fefefe
| 352180 ||  || — || September 5, 2007 || Catalina || CSS || V || align=right data-sort-value="0.96" | 960 m || 
|-id=181 bgcolor=#E9E9E9
| 352181 ||  || — || September 11, 2007 || Purple Mountain || PMO NEO || — || align=right | 2.9 km || 
|-id=182 bgcolor=#fefefe
| 352182 ||  || — || September 10, 2007 || Kitt Peak || Spacewatch || — || align=right | 1.1 km || 
|-id=183 bgcolor=#E9E9E9
| 352183 ||  || — || September 10, 2007 || Kitt Peak || Spacewatch || — || align=right | 2.3 km || 
|-id=184 bgcolor=#E9E9E9
| 352184 ||  || — || September 13, 2007 || Mount Lemmon || Mount Lemmon Survey || — || align=right | 2.4 km || 
|-id=185 bgcolor=#E9E9E9
| 352185 ||  || — || September 10, 2007 || Kitt Peak || Spacewatch || — || align=right | 1.8 km || 
|-id=186 bgcolor=#E9E9E9
| 352186 ||  || — || September 9, 2007 || Kitt Peak || Spacewatch || — || align=right | 1.6 km || 
|-id=187 bgcolor=#E9E9E9
| 352187 ||  || — || September 10, 2007 || Kitt Peak || Spacewatch || — || align=right | 1.0 km || 
|-id=188 bgcolor=#fefefe
| 352188 ||  || — || September 12, 2007 || Mount Lemmon || Mount Lemmon Survey || — || align=right | 1.5 km || 
|-id=189 bgcolor=#E9E9E9
| 352189 ||  || — || September 14, 2007 || Catalina || CSS || EUN || align=right | 1.7 km || 
|-id=190 bgcolor=#E9E9E9
| 352190 ||  || — || September 10, 2007 || Mount Lemmon || Mount Lemmon Survey || — || align=right | 2.3 km || 
|-id=191 bgcolor=#E9E9E9
| 352191 ||  || — || September 11, 2007 || Kitt Peak || Spacewatch || — || align=right | 1.3 km || 
|-id=192 bgcolor=#E9E9E9
| 352192 ||  || — || September 12, 2007 || Catalina || CSS || — || align=right | 2.0 km || 
|-id=193 bgcolor=#E9E9E9
| 352193 ||  || — || September 15, 2007 || Socorro || LINEAR || — || align=right | 1.3 km || 
|-id=194 bgcolor=#fefefe
| 352194 ||  || — || September 12, 2007 || Mount Lemmon || Mount Lemmon Survey || — || align=right | 1.2 km || 
|-id=195 bgcolor=#E9E9E9
| 352195 ||  || — || September 13, 2007 || Catalina || CSS || MAR || align=right | 1.3 km || 
|-id=196 bgcolor=#fefefe
| 352196 ||  || — || September 15, 2007 || Kitt Peak || Spacewatch || — || align=right | 1.1 km || 
|-id=197 bgcolor=#E9E9E9
| 352197 ||  || — || September 5, 2007 || Catalina || CSS || JUN || align=right | 1.7 km || 
|-id=198 bgcolor=#E9E9E9
| 352198 ||  || — || September 3, 2007 || Catalina || CSS || — || align=right | 1.3 km || 
|-id=199 bgcolor=#E9E9E9
| 352199 ||  || — || September 10, 2007 || Kitt Peak || Spacewatch || — || align=right | 1.2 km || 
|-id=200 bgcolor=#E9E9E9
| 352200 ||  || — || September 12, 2007 || Mount Lemmon || Mount Lemmon Survey || — || align=right data-sort-value="0.94" | 940 m || 
|}

352201–352300 

|-bgcolor=#E9E9E9
| 352201 ||  || — || September 10, 2007 || Kitt Peak || Spacewatch || — || align=right data-sort-value="0.90" | 900 m || 
|-id=202 bgcolor=#E9E9E9
| 352202 ||  || — || September 14, 2007 || Mount Lemmon || Mount Lemmon Survey || — || align=right | 2.4 km || 
|-id=203 bgcolor=#E9E9E9
| 352203 ||  || — || September 15, 2007 || Mount Lemmon || Mount Lemmon Survey || WAT || align=right | 2.3 km || 
|-id=204 bgcolor=#E9E9E9
| 352204 ||  || — || September 14, 2007 || Mount Lemmon || Mount Lemmon Survey || — || align=right | 1.7 km || 
|-id=205 bgcolor=#E9E9E9
| 352205 ||  || — || September 9, 2007 || Anderson Mesa || LONEOS || — || align=right | 1.7 km || 
|-id=206 bgcolor=#E9E9E9
| 352206 ||  || — || September 15, 2007 || Anderson Mesa || LONEOS || AEO || align=right | 1.4 km || 
|-id=207 bgcolor=#E9E9E9
| 352207 ||  || — || September 13, 2007 || Catalina || CSS || — || align=right | 1.1 km || 
|-id=208 bgcolor=#E9E9E9
| 352208 ||  || — || September 21, 2007 || Remanzacco || Remanzacco Obs. || — || align=right | 1.3 km || 
|-id=209 bgcolor=#E9E9E9
| 352209 ||  || — || September 20, 2007 || Catalina || CSS || — || align=right | 1.7 km || 
|-id=210 bgcolor=#E9E9E9
| 352210 ||  || — || September 22, 2007 || Črni Vrh || Črni Vrh || IAN || align=right | 1.0 km || 
|-id=211 bgcolor=#E9E9E9
| 352211 ||  || — || September 19, 2007 || Kitt Peak || Spacewatch || — || align=right | 1.4 km || 
|-id=212 bgcolor=#E9E9E9
| 352212 ||  || — || September 24, 2007 || Kitt Peak || Spacewatch || — || align=right | 1.8 km || 
|-id=213 bgcolor=#E9E9E9
| 352213 ||  || — || October 3, 2007 || 7300 || W. K. Y. Yeung || — || align=right | 1.2 km || 
|-id=214 bgcolor=#E9E9E9
| 352214 Szczecin ||  ||  || October 2, 2007 || Charleston || ARO || — || align=right | 1.3 km || 
|-id=215 bgcolor=#E9E9E9
| 352215 ||  || — || October 4, 2007 || Goodricke-Pigott || R. A. Tucker || — || align=right | 2.5 km || 
|-id=216 bgcolor=#E9E9E9
| 352216 ||  || — || October 5, 2007 || Kitt Peak || Spacewatch || — || align=right | 1.5 km || 
|-id=217 bgcolor=#E9E9E9
| 352217 ||  || — || October 9, 2007 || Mount Lemmon || Mount Lemmon Survey || — || align=right | 2.2 km || 
|-id=218 bgcolor=#E9E9E9
| 352218 ||  || — || October 4, 2007 || Kitt Peak || Spacewatch || EUN || align=right | 1.7 km || 
|-id=219 bgcolor=#E9E9E9
| 352219 ||  || — || October 5, 2007 || Siding Spring || SSS || — || align=right | 2.0 km || 
|-id=220 bgcolor=#E9E9E9
| 352220 ||  || — || October 6, 2007 || Kitt Peak || Spacewatch || — || align=right | 1.6 km || 
|-id=221 bgcolor=#E9E9E9
| 352221 ||  || — || October 6, 2007 || Kitt Peak || Spacewatch || — || align=right | 2.9 km || 
|-id=222 bgcolor=#E9E9E9
| 352222 ||  || — || October 7, 2007 || Catalina || CSS || — || align=right | 3.2 km || 
|-id=223 bgcolor=#E9E9E9
| 352223 ||  || — || October 4, 2007 || Kitt Peak || Spacewatch || DOR || align=right | 2.2 km || 
|-id=224 bgcolor=#E9E9E9
| 352224 ||  || — || October 7, 2007 || Mount Lemmon || Mount Lemmon Survey || HEN || align=right | 1.1 km || 
|-id=225 bgcolor=#E9E9E9
| 352225 ||  || — || October 7, 2007 || Mount Lemmon || Mount Lemmon Survey || — || align=right | 2.8 km || 
|-id=226 bgcolor=#FA8072
| 352226 ||  || — || September 14, 2007 || Mount Lemmon || Mount Lemmon Survey || H || align=right data-sort-value="0.68" | 680 m || 
|-id=227 bgcolor=#E9E9E9
| 352227 ||  || — || October 12, 2007 || 7300 || W. K. Y. Yeung || — || align=right | 1.3 km || 
|-id=228 bgcolor=#E9E9E9
| 352228 ||  || — || October 3, 2007 || Purple Mountain || PMO NEO || — || align=right | 3.1 km || 
|-id=229 bgcolor=#E9E9E9
| 352229 ||  || — || October 10, 2007 || Mount Lemmon || Mount Lemmon Survey || — || align=right | 1.3 km || 
|-id=230 bgcolor=#E9E9E9
| 352230 ||  || — || October 14, 2007 || Altschwendt || W. Ries || — || align=right | 1.3 km || 
|-id=231 bgcolor=#E9E9E9
| 352231 ||  || — || October 5, 2007 || Kitt Peak || Spacewatch || — || align=right | 2.2 km || 
|-id=232 bgcolor=#E9E9E9
| 352232 ||  || — || October 5, 2007 || Kitt Peak || Spacewatch || — || align=right | 1.1 km || 
|-id=233 bgcolor=#E9E9E9
| 352233 ||  || — || October 8, 2007 || Mount Lemmon || Mount Lemmon Survey || — || align=right data-sort-value="0.99" | 990 m || 
|-id=234 bgcolor=#fefefe
| 352234 ||  || — || October 8, 2007 || Mount Lemmon || Mount Lemmon Survey || NYS || align=right data-sort-value="0.74" | 740 m || 
|-id=235 bgcolor=#E9E9E9
| 352235 ||  || — || October 4, 2007 || Catalina || CSS || — || align=right | 1.4 km || 
|-id=236 bgcolor=#E9E9E9
| 352236 ||  || — || October 8, 2007 || Catalina || CSS || — || align=right | 1.1 km || 
|-id=237 bgcolor=#E9E9E9
| 352237 ||  || — || October 6, 2007 || Kitt Peak || Spacewatch || — || align=right | 2.1 km || 
|-id=238 bgcolor=#E9E9E9
| 352238 ||  || — || October 7, 2007 || Mount Lemmon || Mount Lemmon Survey || — || align=right | 2.5 km || 
|-id=239 bgcolor=#E9E9E9
| 352239 ||  || — || October 8, 2007 || Kitt Peak || Spacewatch || — || align=right data-sort-value="0.70" | 700 m || 
|-id=240 bgcolor=#E9E9E9
| 352240 ||  || — || October 8, 2007 || Catalina || CSS || — || align=right | 2.0 km || 
|-id=241 bgcolor=#fefefe
| 352241 ||  || — || October 8, 2007 || Catalina || CSS || H || align=right data-sort-value="0.87" | 870 m || 
|-id=242 bgcolor=#E9E9E9
| 352242 ||  || — || October 9, 2007 || Kitt Peak || Spacewatch || — || align=right | 1.8 km || 
|-id=243 bgcolor=#E9E9E9
| 352243 ||  || — || October 14, 2007 || Dauban || Chante-Perdrix Obs. || — || align=right | 1.8 km || 
|-id=244 bgcolor=#E9E9E9
| 352244 ||  || — || October 6, 2007 || Socorro || LINEAR || NEM || align=right | 2.5 km || 
|-id=245 bgcolor=#E9E9E9
| 352245 ||  || — || October 9, 2007 || Socorro || LINEAR || — || align=right | 1.8 km || 
|-id=246 bgcolor=#E9E9E9
| 352246 ||  || — || October 9, 2007 || Dauban || Chante-Perdrix Obs. || — || align=right | 2.9 km || 
|-id=247 bgcolor=#E9E9E9
| 352247 ||  || — || October 11, 2007 || Socorro || LINEAR || — || align=right | 1.6 km || 
|-id=248 bgcolor=#E9E9E9
| 352248 ||  || — || October 11, 2007 || Socorro || LINEAR || HEN || align=right | 1.3 km || 
|-id=249 bgcolor=#E9E9E9
| 352249 ||  || — || October 11, 2007 || Socorro || LINEAR || WIT || align=right | 1.7 km || 
|-id=250 bgcolor=#E9E9E9
| 352250 ||  || — || October 12, 2007 || Socorro || LINEAR || HNA || align=right | 2.3 km || 
|-id=251 bgcolor=#E9E9E9
| 352251 ||  || — || October 12, 2007 || Socorro || LINEAR || — || align=right | 1.7 km || 
|-id=252 bgcolor=#E9E9E9
| 352252 ||  || — || October 13, 2007 || Socorro || LINEAR || — || align=right | 3.1 km || 
|-id=253 bgcolor=#E9E9E9
| 352253 ||  || — || October 4, 2007 || Kitt Peak || Spacewatch || — || align=right | 2.4 km || 
|-id=254 bgcolor=#E9E9E9
| 352254 ||  || — || September 10, 2007 || Catalina || CSS || — || align=right | 1.9 km || 
|-id=255 bgcolor=#E9E9E9
| 352255 ||  || — || October 8, 2007 || Anderson Mesa || LONEOS || — || align=right | 1.7 km || 
|-id=256 bgcolor=#E9E9E9
| 352256 ||  || — || October 13, 2007 || Socorro || LINEAR || — || align=right | 1.6 km || 
|-id=257 bgcolor=#E9E9E9
| 352257 ||  || — || October 4, 2007 || Mount Lemmon || Mount Lemmon Survey || — || align=right data-sort-value="0.75" | 750 m || 
|-id=258 bgcolor=#E9E9E9
| 352258 ||  || — || October 7, 2007 || Mount Lemmon || Mount Lemmon Survey || — || align=right | 1.8 km || 
|-id=259 bgcolor=#E9E9E9
| 352259 ||  || — || October 8, 2007 || Kitt Peak || Spacewatch || HEN || align=right data-sort-value="0.94" | 940 m || 
|-id=260 bgcolor=#E9E9E9
| 352260 ||  || — || October 11, 2007 || Mount Lemmon || Mount Lemmon Survey || — || align=right | 1.5 km || 
|-id=261 bgcolor=#E9E9E9
| 352261 ||  || — || October 7, 2007 || Kitt Peak || Spacewatch || — || align=right | 2.0 km || 
|-id=262 bgcolor=#E9E9E9
| 352262 ||  || — || October 7, 2007 || Kitt Peak || Spacewatch || NEM || align=right | 2.2 km || 
|-id=263 bgcolor=#E9E9E9
| 352263 ||  || — || October 7, 2007 || Kitt Peak || Spacewatch || — || align=right | 1.8 km || 
|-id=264 bgcolor=#E9E9E9
| 352264 ||  || — || October 9, 2007 || Kitt Peak || Spacewatch || — || align=right | 1.1 km || 
|-id=265 bgcolor=#E9E9E9
| 352265 ||  || — || October 9, 2007 || Purple Mountain || PMO NEO || — || align=right | 2.1 km || 
|-id=266 bgcolor=#E9E9E9
| 352266 ||  || — || October 11, 2007 || Mount Lemmon || Mount Lemmon Survey || — || align=right | 1.0 km || 
|-id=267 bgcolor=#E9E9E9
| 352267 ||  || — || October 7, 2007 || Catalina || CSS || — || align=right | 2.7 km || 
|-id=268 bgcolor=#E9E9E9
| 352268 ||  || — || October 9, 2007 || Kitt Peak || Spacewatch || HEN || align=right | 1.5 km || 
|-id=269 bgcolor=#E9E9E9
| 352269 ||  || — || September 13, 2002 || Palomar || NEAT || HOF || align=right | 2.4 km || 
|-id=270 bgcolor=#E9E9E9
| 352270 ||  || — || October 11, 2007 || Mount Lemmon || Mount Lemmon Survey || — || align=right | 2.3 km || 
|-id=271 bgcolor=#E9E9E9
| 352271 ||  || — || October 9, 2007 || Mount Lemmon || Mount Lemmon Survey || — || align=right | 2.8 km || 
|-id=272 bgcolor=#E9E9E9
| 352272 ||  || — || October 9, 2007 || Mount Lemmon || Mount Lemmon Survey || HEN || align=right data-sort-value="0.89" | 890 m || 
|-id=273 bgcolor=#E9E9E9
| 352273 Turrell ||  ||  || October 11, 2007 || Anderson Mesa || L. H. Wasserman || — || align=right | 2.3 km || 
|-id=274 bgcolor=#E9E9E9
| 352274 ||  || — || October 8, 2007 || Mount Lemmon || Mount Lemmon Survey || — || align=right | 2.9 km || 
|-id=275 bgcolor=#E9E9E9
| 352275 ||  || — || October 11, 2007 || Kitt Peak || Spacewatch || — || align=right | 2.6 km || 
|-id=276 bgcolor=#E9E9E9
| 352276 ||  || — || October 11, 2007 || Kitt Peak || Spacewatch || — || align=right | 1.2 km || 
|-id=277 bgcolor=#E9E9E9
| 352277 ||  || — || October 13, 2007 || Catalina || CSS || — || align=right | 1.8 km || 
|-id=278 bgcolor=#E9E9E9
| 352278 ||  || — || October 14, 2007 || Mount Lemmon || Mount Lemmon Survey || — || align=right data-sort-value="0.98" | 980 m || 
|-id=279 bgcolor=#E9E9E9
| 352279 ||  || — || October 9, 2007 || Kitt Peak || Spacewatch || — || align=right | 1.1 km || 
|-id=280 bgcolor=#E9E9E9
| 352280 ||  || — || October 18, 2003 || Kitt Peak || Spacewatch || — || align=right | 1.5 km || 
|-id=281 bgcolor=#E9E9E9
| 352281 ||  || — || October 13, 2007 || Anderson Mesa || LONEOS || — || align=right | 2.6 km || 
|-id=282 bgcolor=#E9E9E9
| 352282 ||  || — || October 13, 2007 || Altschwendt || W. Ries || HEN || align=right | 1.0 km || 
|-id=283 bgcolor=#E9E9E9
| 352283 ||  || — || October 11, 2007 || Kitt Peak || Spacewatch || — || align=right | 2.9 km || 
|-id=284 bgcolor=#E9E9E9
| 352284 ||  || — || October 13, 2007 || Catalina || CSS || — || align=right | 1.9 km || 
|-id=285 bgcolor=#E9E9E9
| 352285 ||  || — || October 13, 2007 || Catalina || CSS || — || align=right data-sort-value="0.96" | 960 m || 
|-id=286 bgcolor=#E9E9E9
| 352286 ||  || — || October 15, 2007 || Mount Lemmon || Mount Lemmon Survey || — || align=right | 1.7 km || 
|-id=287 bgcolor=#E9E9E9
| 352287 ||  || — || October 15, 2007 || Kitt Peak || Spacewatch || — || align=right | 2.2 km || 
|-id=288 bgcolor=#E9E9E9
| 352288 ||  || — || October 15, 2007 || Kitt Peak || Spacewatch || — || align=right | 2.4 km || 
|-id=289 bgcolor=#E9E9E9
| 352289 ||  || — || September 12, 2007 || Catalina || CSS || HNS || align=right | 1.4 km || 
|-id=290 bgcolor=#E9E9E9
| 352290 ||  || — || February 12, 2004 || Kitt Peak || Spacewatch || — || align=right | 2.5 km || 
|-id=291 bgcolor=#E9E9E9
| 352291 ||  || — || January 15, 2004 || Kitt Peak || Spacewatch || — || align=right | 1.9 km || 
|-id=292 bgcolor=#E9E9E9
| 352292 ||  || — || October 10, 2007 || Lulin || LUSS || — || align=right | 1.5 km || 
|-id=293 bgcolor=#E9E9E9
| 352293 ||  || — || October 2, 2007 || Siding Spring || SSS || KAZ || align=right | 1.3 km || 
|-id=294 bgcolor=#E9E9E9
| 352294 ||  || — || October 11, 2007 || Catalina || CSS || MAR || align=right | 1.5 km || 
|-id=295 bgcolor=#E9E9E9
| 352295 ||  || — || October 9, 2007 || Mount Lemmon || Mount Lemmon Survey || — || align=right | 1.6 km || 
|-id=296 bgcolor=#E9E9E9
| 352296 ||  || — || October 9, 2007 || Mount Lemmon || Mount Lemmon Survey || MIS || align=right | 2.5 km || 
|-id=297 bgcolor=#E9E9E9
| 352297 ||  || — || October 13, 2007 || Mount Lemmon || Mount Lemmon Survey || — || align=right | 1.7 km || 
|-id=298 bgcolor=#E9E9E9
| 352298 ||  || — || October 11, 2007 || Catalina || CSS || — || align=right | 3.4 km || 
|-id=299 bgcolor=#E9E9E9
| 352299 ||  || — || October 10, 2007 || Catalina || CSS || DOR || align=right | 2.2 km || 
|-id=300 bgcolor=#E9E9E9
| 352300 ||  || — || October 8, 2007 || Anderson Mesa || LONEOS || — || align=right | 3.3 km || 
|}

352301–352400 

|-bgcolor=#E9E9E9
| 352301 ||  || — || December 15, 1999 || Kitt Peak || Spacewatch || — || align=right | 1.5 km || 
|-id=302 bgcolor=#E9E9E9
| 352302 ||  || — || October 8, 2007 || Catalina || CSS || — || align=right | 2.7 km || 
|-id=303 bgcolor=#d6d6d6
| 352303 ||  || — || October 15, 2007 || Mount Lemmon || Mount Lemmon Survey || — || align=right | 4.3 km || 
|-id=304 bgcolor=#d6d6d6
| 352304 ||  || — || October 18, 2007 || Junk Bond || D. Healy || EUP || align=right | 5.9 km || 
|-id=305 bgcolor=#E9E9E9
| 352305 ||  || — || October 16, 2007 || Catalina || CSS || — || align=right | 2.3 km || 
|-id=306 bgcolor=#E9E9E9
| 352306 ||  || — || October 18, 2007 || Mount Lemmon || Mount Lemmon Survey || — || align=right | 1.4 km || 
|-id=307 bgcolor=#E9E9E9
| 352307 ||  || — || October 16, 2007 || Kitt Peak || Spacewatch || WIT || align=right data-sort-value="0.99" | 990 m || 
|-id=308 bgcolor=#E9E9E9
| 352308 ||  || — || October 19, 2007 || Catalina || CSS || — || align=right data-sort-value="0.94" | 940 m || 
|-id=309 bgcolor=#E9E9E9
| 352309 ||  || — || October 20, 2007 || Catalina || CSS || — || align=right | 2.5 km || 
|-id=310 bgcolor=#E9E9E9
| 352310 ||  || — || October 19, 2007 || Catalina || CSS || ADE || align=right | 2.8 km || 
|-id=311 bgcolor=#E9E9E9
| 352311 ||  || — || October 30, 2007 || Mount Lemmon || Mount Lemmon Survey || — || align=right | 2.3 km || 
|-id=312 bgcolor=#E9E9E9
| 352312 ||  || — || October 30, 2007 || Mount Lemmon || Mount Lemmon Survey || — || align=right | 1.2 km || 
|-id=313 bgcolor=#E9E9E9
| 352313 ||  || — || October 31, 2007 || Mount Lemmon || Mount Lemmon Survey || — || align=right | 2.0 km || 
|-id=314 bgcolor=#E9E9E9
| 352314 ||  || — || October 19, 2007 || Kitt Peak || Spacewatch || — || align=right | 1.5 km || 
|-id=315 bgcolor=#E9E9E9
| 352315 ||  || — || October 30, 2007 || Kitt Peak || Spacewatch || JUN || align=right | 1.1 km || 
|-id=316 bgcolor=#E9E9E9
| 352316 ||  || — || October 30, 2007 || Kitt Peak || Spacewatch || HEN || align=right | 1.1 km || 
|-id=317 bgcolor=#E9E9E9
| 352317 ||  || — || October 30, 2007 || Kitt Peak || Spacewatch || — || align=right | 1.8 km || 
|-id=318 bgcolor=#E9E9E9
| 352318 ||  || — || October 30, 2007 || Mount Lemmon || Mount Lemmon Survey || — || align=right | 1.5 km || 
|-id=319 bgcolor=#E9E9E9
| 352319 ||  || — || October 20, 2007 || Mount Lemmon || Mount Lemmon Survey || AGN || align=right | 1.4 km || 
|-id=320 bgcolor=#E9E9E9
| 352320 ||  || — || October 31, 2007 || Mount Lemmon || Mount Lemmon Survey || — || align=right | 2.5 km || 
|-id=321 bgcolor=#E9E9E9
| 352321 ||  || — || October 10, 2007 || Kitt Peak || Spacewatch || — || align=right | 1.9 km || 
|-id=322 bgcolor=#E9E9E9
| 352322 ||  || — || October 31, 2007 || Kitt Peak || Spacewatch || — || align=right | 1.5 km || 
|-id=323 bgcolor=#E9E9E9
| 352323 ||  || — || October 31, 2007 || Kitt Peak || Spacewatch || — || align=right | 1.9 km || 
|-id=324 bgcolor=#E9E9E9
| 352324 ||  || — || October 30, 2007 || Kitt Peak || Spacewatch || KON || align=right | 2.7 km || 
|-id=325 bgcolor=#E9E9E9
| 352325 ||  || — || October 31, 2007 || Catalina || CSS || — || align=right | 2.1 km || 
|-id=326 bgcolor=#E9E9E9
| 352326 ||  || — || October 20, 2007 || Mount Lemmon || Mount Lemmon Survey || GEF || align=right | 1.3 km || 
|-id=327 bgcolor=#d6d6d6
| 352327 ||  || — || October 16, 2007 || Mount Lemmon || Mount Lemmon Survey || — || align=right | 3.6 km || 
|-id=328 bgcolor=#E9E9E9
| 352328 ||  || — || October 16, 2007 || Mount Lemmon || Mount Lemmon Survey || — || align=right | 2.2 km || 
|-id=329 bgcolor=#E9E9E9
| 352329 ||  || — || October 20, 2007 || Mount Lemmon || Mount Lemmon Survey || PAD || align=right | 1.9 km || 
|-id=330 bgcolor=#E9E9E9
| 352330 ||  || — || October 30, 2007 || Catalina || CSS || — || align=right | 1.2 km || 
|-id=331 bgcolor=#E9E9E9
| 352331 ||  || — || October 30, 2007 || Kitt Peak || Spacewatch || fast? || align=right | 3.3 km || 
|-id=332 bgcolor=#d6d6d6
| 352332 ||  || — || October 24, 2007 || Mount Lemmon || Mount Lemmon Survey || KOR || align=right | 1.9 km || 
|-id=333 bgcolor=#E9E9E9
| 352333 Sylvievauclair ||  ||  || November 1, 2007 || Marly || P. Kocher || — || align=right | 2.5 km || 
|-id=334 bgcolor=#E9E9E9
| 352334 ||  || — || November 2, 2007 || Eskridge || G. Hug || — || align=right | 3.0 km || 
|-id=335 bgcolor=#E9E9E9
| 352335 ||  || — || November 1, 2007 || Kitt Peak || Spacewatch || — || align=right | 2.6 km || 
|-id=336 bgcolor=#E9E9E9
| 352336 ||  || — || November 1, 2007 || Mount Lemmon || Mount Lemmon Survey || — || align=right | 1.6 km || 
|-id=337 bgcolor=#E9E9E9
| 352337 ||  || — || October 10, 2007 || Catalina || CSS || EUN || align=right | 1.5 km || 
|-id=338 bgcolor=#E9E9E9
| 352338 ||  || — || November 1, 2007 || Kitt Peak || Spacewatch || — || align=right | 2.3 km || 
|-id=339 bgcolor=#E9E9E9
| 352339 ||  || — || November 1, 2007 || Kitt Peak || Spacewatch || GEF || align=right | 1.1 km || 
|-id=340 bgcolor=#E9E9E9
| 352340 ||  || — || November 1, 2007 || Kitt Peak || Spacewatch || — || align=right | 2.1 km || 
|-id=341 bgcolor=#E9E9E9
| 352341 ||  || — || November 2, 2007 || Kitt Peak || Spacewatch || — || align=right | 2.0 km || 
|-id=342 bgcolor=#E9E9E9
| 352342 ||  || — || November 3, 2007 || Kitt Peak || Spacewatch || — || align=right | 1.6 km || 
|-id=343 bgcolor=#E9E9E9
| 352343 ||  || — || October 8, 2007 || Mount Lemmon || Mount Lemmon Survey || — || align=right | 1.3 km || 
|-id=344 bgcolor=#E9E9E9
| 352344 ||  || — || November 2, 2007 || Socorro || LINEAR || RAF || align=right | 1.1 km || 
|-id=345 bgcolor=#E9E9E9
| 352345 ||  || — || November 2, 2007 || Socorro || LINEAR || — || align=right | 1.5 km || 
|-id=346 bgcolor=#E9E9E9
| 352346 ||  || — || November 2, 2007 || Kitt Peak || Spacewatch || NEM || align=right | 2.6 km || 
|-id=347 bgcolor=#E9E9E9
| 352347 ||  || — || November 3, 2007 || Kitt Peak || Spacewatch || NEM || align=right | 2.3 km || 
|-id=348 bgcolor=#d6d6d6
| 352348 ||  || — || November 3, 2007 || Kitt Peak || Spacewatch || — || align=right | 2.7 km || 
|-id=349 bgcolor=#d6d6d6
| 352349 ||  || — || November 3, 2007 || Kitt Peak || Spacewatch || K-2 || align=right | 1.3 km || 
|-id=350 bgcolor=#E9E9E9
| 352350 ||  || — || November 5, 2007 || Mount Lemmon || Mount Lemmon Survey || DOR || align=right | 3.3 km || 
|-id=351 bgcolor=#E9E9E9
| 352351 ||  || — || November 2, 2007 || Catalina || CSS || — || align=right | 2.2 km || 
|-id=352 bgcolor=#E9E9E9
| 352352 ||  || — || October 12, 2007 || Kitt Peak || Spacewatch || — || align=right data-sort-value="0.86" | 860 m || 
|-id=353 bgcolor=#d6d6d6
| 352353 ||  || — || November 5, 2007 || Mount Lemmon || Mount Lemmon Survey || — || align=right | 2.6 km || 
|-id=354 bgcolor=#E9E9E9
| 352354 ||  || — || November 5, 2007 || Kitt Peak || Spacewatch || — || align=right | 2.2 km || 
|-id=355 bgcolor=#E9E9E9
| 352355 ||  || — || November 7, 2007 || Kitt Peak || Spacewatch || — || align=right | 2.1 km || 
|-id=356 bgcolor=#E9E9E9
| 352356 ||  || — || November 8, 2007 || Catalina || CSS || — || align=right | 2.6 km || 
|-id=357 bgcolor=#E9E9E9
| 352357 ||  || — || November 11, 2007 || Bisei SG Center || BATTeRS || — || align=right | 2.1 km || 
|-id=358 bgcolor=#E9E9E9
| 352358 ||  || — || November 5, 2007 || Kitt Peak || Spacewatch || — || align=right | 1.8 km || 
|-id=359 bgcolor=#E9E9E9
| 352359 ||  || — || November 5, 2007 || Kitt Peak || Spacewatch || — || align=right | 1.8 km || 
|-id=360 bgcolor=#E9E9E9
| 352360 ||  || — || November 9, 2007 || Kitt Peak || Spacewatch || — || align=right | 2.0 km || 
|-id=361 bgcolor=#E9E9E9
| 352361 ||  || — || November 9, 2007 || Mount Lemmon || Mount Lemmon Survey || — || align=right | 1.6 km || 
|-id=362 bgcolor=#E9E9E9
| 352362 ||  || — || November 9, 2007 || Mount Lemmon || Mount Lemmon Survey || AGN || align=right | 1.2 km || 
|-id=363 bgcolor=#E9E9E9
| 352363 ||  || — || November 9, 2007 || Kitt Peak || Spacewatch || — || align=right | 1.2 km || 
|-id=364 bgcolor=#fefefe
| 352364 ||  || — || November 9, 2007 || Kitt Peak || Spacewatch || — || align=right data-sort-value="0.86" | 860 m || 
|-id=365 bgcolor=#E9E9E9
| 352365 ||  || — || November 9, 2007 || Kitt Peak || Spacewatch || NEM || align=right | 2.5 km || 
|-id=366 bgcolor=#E9E9E9
| 352366 ||  || — || November 9, 2007 || Kitt Peak || Spacewatch || HEN || align=right | 1.1 km || 
|-id=367 bgcolor=#E9E9E9
| 352367 ||  || — || November 8, 2007 || Kitt Peak || Spacewatch || — || align=right | 1.4 km || 
|-id=368 bgcolor=#E9E9E9
| 352368 ||  || — || November 12, 2007 || Catalina || CSS || EUN || align=right | 1.4 km || 
|-id=369 bgcolor=#d6d6d6
| 352369 ||  || — || November 13, 2007 || Mount Lemmon || Mount Lemmon Survey || — || align=right | 3.1 km || 
|-id=370 bgcolor=#E9E9E9
| 352370 ||  || — || November 15, 2007 || La Sagra || OAM Obs. || — || align=right | 2.2 km || 
|-id=371 bgcolor=#d6d6d6
| 352371 ||  || — || November 15, 2007 || Catalina || CSS || — || align=right | 3.3 km || 
|-id=372 bgcolor=#E9E9E9
| 352372 ||  || — || November 11, 2007 || Mount Lemmon || Mount Lemmon Survey || — || align=right | 1.3 km || 
|-id=373 bgcolor=#E9E9E9
| 352373 ||  || — || November 15, 2007 || Anderson Mesa || LONEOS || HNS || align=right | 1.7 km || 
|-id=374 bgcolor=#E9E9E9
| 352374 ||  || — || November 13, 2007 || Kitt Peak || Spacewatch || — || align=right | 2.1 km || 
|-id=375 bgcolor=#E9E9E9
| 352375 ||  || — || November 14, 2007 || Socorro || LINEAR || — || align=right | 2.5 km || 
|-id=376 bgcolor=#E9E9E9
| 352376 ||  || — || November 14, 2007 || Kitt Peak || Spacewatch || — || align=right | 1.4 km || 
|-id=377 bgcolor=#d6d6d6
| 352377 ||  || — || November 14, 2007 || Kitt Peak || Spacewatch || — || align=right | 3.2 km || 
|-id=378 bgcolor=#d6d6d6
| 352378 ||  || — || November 14, 2007 || Kitt Peak || Spacewatch || — || align=right | 4.1 km || 
|-id=379 bgcolor=#E9E9E9
| 352379 ||  || — || November 11, 2007 || Catalina || CSS || — || align=right | 2.2 km || 
|-id=380 bgcolor=#E9E9E9
| 352380 ||  || — || November 11, 2007 || Anderson Mesa || LONEOS || — || align=right | 2.6 km || 
|-id=381 bgcolor=#E9E9E9
| 352381 ||  || — || November 7, 2007 || Catalina || CSS || — || align=right | 3.1 km || 
|-id=382 bgcolor=#d6d6d6
| 352382 ||  || — || November 3, 2007 || Mount Lemmon || Mount Lemmon Survey || — || align=right | 2.9 km || 
|-id=383 bgcolor=#E9E9E9
| 352383 ||  || — || November 7, 2007 || Kitt Peak || Spacewatch || — || align=right | 1.9 km || 
|-id=384 bgcolor=#E9E9E9
| 352384 ||  || — || November 5, 2007 || Socorro || LINEAR || WIT || align=right | 1.2 km || 
|-id=385 bgcolor=#E9E9E9
| 352385 ||  || — || November 8, 2007 || Socorro || LINEAR || — || align=right | 2.8 km || 
|-id=386 bgcolor=#E9E9E9
| 352386 ||  || — || November 6, 2007 || Kitt Peak || Spacewatch || NEM || align=right | 2.3 km || 
|-id=387 bgcolor=#d6d6d6
| 352387 ||  || — || November 7, 2007 || Kitt Peak || Spacewatch || K-2 || align=right | 1.7 km || 
|-id=388 bgcolor=#E9E9E9
| 352388 ||  || — || November 17, 2007 || Socorro || LINEAR || — || align=right | 2.7 km || 
|-id=389 bgcolor=#d6d6d6
| 352389 ||  || — || November 8, 2007 || Kitt Peak || Spacewatch || — || align=right | 4.2 km || 
|-id=390 bgcolor=#E9E9E9
| 352390 ||  || — || October 17, 2007 || Mount Lemmon || Mount Lemmon Survey || — || align=right | 1.8 km || 
|-id=391 bgcolor=#E9E9E9
| 352391 ||  || — || November 18, 2007 || Mount Lemmon || Mount Lemmon Survey || — || align=right | 3.0 km || 
|-id=392 bgcolor=#E9E9E9
| 352392 ||  || — || November 17, 2007 || Kitt Peak || Spacewatch || MRX || align=right data-sort-value="0.91" | 910 m || 
|-id=393 bgcolor=#E9E9E9
| 352393 ||  || — || January 19, 2004 || Kitt Peak || Spacewatch || — || align=right | 2.0 km || 
|-id=394 bgcolor=#E9E9E9
| 352394 ||  || — || November 19, 2007 || Mount Lemmon || Mount Lemmon Survey || — || align=right | 2.3 km || 
|-id=395 bgcolor=#d6d6d6
| 352395 ||  || — || November 20, 2007 || Mount Lemmon || Mount Lemmon Survey || — || align=right | 2.3 km || 
|-id=396 bgcolor=#E9E9E9
| 352396 ||  || — || November 29, 2007 || Eskridge || G. Hug || — || align=right | 3.1 km || 
|-id=397 bgcolor=#d6d6d6
| 352397 ||  || — || November 18, 2007 || Mount Lemmon || Mount Lemmon Survey || EMA || align=right | 3.8 km || 
|-id=398 bgcolor=#d6d6d6
| 352398 ||  || — || November 19, 2007 || Mount Lemmon || Mount Lemmon Survey || — || align=right | 3.3 km || 
|-id=399 bgcolor=#E9E9E9
| 352399 ||  || — || November 9, 2007 || Kitt Peak || Spacewatch || — || align=right | 2.8 km || 
|-id=400 bgcolor=#E9E9E9
| 352400 ||  || — || December 4, 2007 || Kitt Peak || Spacewatch || AEO || align=right | 1.3 km || 
|}

352401–352500 

|-bgcolor=#E9E9E9
| 352401 ||  || — || December 5, 2007 || La Sagra || OAM Obs. || HOF || align=right | 3.2 km || 
|-id=402 bgcolor=#E9E9E9
| 352402 ||  || — || December 5, 2007 || Mount Lemmon || Mount Lemmon Survey || AGN || align=right | 1.5 km || 
|-id=403 bgcolor=#E9E9E9
| 352403 ||  || — || December 5, 2007 || Mount Lemmon || Mount Lemmon Survey || — || align=right | 2.2 km || 
|-id=404 bgcolor=#E9E9E9
| 352404 ||  || — || December 12, 2007 || Socorro || LINEAR || — || align=right | 2.3 km || 
|-id=405 bgcolor=#E9E9E9
| 352405 ||  || — || December 14, 2007 || Kitt Peak || Spacewatch || — || align=right | 3.3 km || 
|-id=406 bgcolor=#E9E9E9
| 352406 ||  || — || December 15, 2007 || Catalina || CSS || — || align=right | 2.9 km || 
|-id=407 bgcolor=#d6d6d6
| 352407 ||  || — || December 13, 2007 || Socorro || LINEAR || — || align=right | 8.8 km || 
|-id=408 bgcolor=#d6d6d6
| 352408 ||  || — || December 14, 2007 || Socorro || LINEAR || EOS || align=right | 2.4 km || 
|-id=409 bgcolor=#d6d6d6
| 352409 ||  || — || December 14, 2007 || Socorro || LINEAR || ALA || align=right | 3.7 km || 
|-id=410 bgcolor=#d6d6d6
| 352410 ||  || — || December 14, 2007 || Mount Lemmon || Mount Lemmon Survey || — || align=right | 3.7 km || 
|-id=411 bgcolor=#E9E9E9
| 352411 ||  || — || December 6, 2007 || Kitt Peak || Spacewatch || AGN || align=right | 1.5 km || 
|-id=412 bgcolor=#d6d6d6
| 352412 ||  || — || December 15, 2007 || Mount Lemmon || Mount Lemmon Survey || — || align=right | 3.9 km || 
|-id=413 bgcolor=#E9E9E9
| 352413 ||  || — || December 4, 2007 || Catalina || CSS || — || align=right | 3.6 km || 
|-id=414 bgcolor=#d6d6d6
| 352414 ||  || — || December 5, 2007 || Mount Lemmon || Mount Lemmon Survey || — || align=right | 2.8 km || 
|-id=415 bgcolor=#d6d6d6
| 352415 ||  || — || December 14, 2007 || Charleston || ARO || — || align=right | 2.8 km || 
|-id=416 bgcolor=#d6d6d6
| 352416 ||  || — || August 16, 2001 || Palomar || NEAT || — || align=right | 3.5 km || 
|-id=417 bgcolor=#d6d6d6
| 352417 ||  || — || December 5, 2007 || Kitt Peak || Spacewatch || CHA || align=right | 2.0 km || 
|-id=418 bgcolor=#d6d6d6
| 352418 ||  || — || December 17, 2007 || Mount Lemmon || Mount Lemmon Survey || — || align=right | 2.6 km || 
|-id=419 bgcolor=#E9E9E9
| 352419 ||  || — || December 5, 2007 || Kitt Peak || Spacewatch || PAD || align=right | 1.9 km || 
|-id=420 bgcolor=#d6d6d6
| 352420 ||  || — || December 16, 2007 || Kitt Peak || Spacewatch || — || align=right | 4.4 km || 
|-id=421 bgcolor=#d6d6d6
| 352421 ||  || — || December 16, 2007 || Kitt Peak || Spacewatch || — || align=right | 6.5 km || 
|-id=422 bgcolor=#E9E9E9
| 352422 ||  || — || December 30, 2007 || Mount Lemmon || Mount Lemmon Survey || AGN || align=right | 1.2 km || 
|-id=423 bgcolor=#d6d6d6
| 352423 ||  || — || December 30, 2007 || Kitt Peak || Spacewatch || THM || align=right | 2.6 km || 
|-id=424 bgcolor=#d6d6d6
| 352424 ||  || — || December 30, 2007 || Mount Lemmon || Mount Lemmon Survey || EOS || align=right | 2.5 km || 
|-id=425 bgcolor=#d6d6d6
| 352425 ||  || — || December 28, 2007 || Kitt Peak || Spacewatch || EOS || align=right | 2.3 km || 
|-id=426 bgcolor=#d6d6d6
| 352426 ||  || — || December 31, 2007 || Kitt Peak || Spacewatch || — || align=right | 3.9 km || 
|-id=427 bgcolor=#E9E9E9
| 352427 ||  || — || December 30, 2007 || Mount Lemmon || Mount Lemmon Survey || — || align=right | 1.3 km || 
|-id=428 bgcolor=#E9E9E9
| 352428 ||  || — || December 19, 2007 || Catalina || CSS || — || align=right | 3.8 km || 
|-id=429 bgcolor=#d6d6d6
| 352429 ||  || — || December 20, 2007 || Mount Lemmon || Mount Lemmon Survey || — || align=right | 3.2 km || 
|-id=430 bgcolor=#d6d6d6
| 352430 ||  || — || December 31, 2007 || Catalina || CSS || — || align=right | 2.6 km || 
|-id=431 bgcolor=#d6d6d6
| 352431 ||  || — || January 7, 2008 || Lulin || LUSS || — || align=right | 3.4 km || 
|-id=432 bgcolor=#d6d6d6
| 352432 ||  || — || January 10, 2008 || Mount Lemmon || Mount Lemmon Survey || EOS || align=right | 2.4 km || 
|-id=433 bgcolor=#d6d6d6
| 352433 ||  || — || January 10, 2008 || Mount Lemmon || Mount Lemmon Survey || EOS || align=right | 2.2 km || 
|-id=434 bgcolor=#d6d6d6
| 352434 ||  || — || January 10, 2008 || Kitt Peak || Spacewatch || — || align=right | 2.7 km || 
|-id=435 bgcolor=#d6d6d6
| 352435 ||  || — || January 10, 2008 || Mount Lemmon || Mount Lemmon Survey || — || align=right | 3.4 km || 
|-id=436 bgcolor=#d6d6d6
| 352436 ||  || — || January 10, 2008 || Mount Lemmon || Mount Lemmon Survey || — || align=right | 3.1 km || 
|-id=437 bgcolor=#d6d6d6
| 352437 ||  || — || January 10, 2008 || Mount Lemmon || Mount Lemmon Survey || — || align=right | 2.9 km || 
|-id=438 bgcolor=#d6d6d6
| 352438 ||  || — || January 10, 2008 || Mount Lemmon || Mount Lemmon Survey || — || align=right | 2.2 km || 
|-id=439 bgcolor=#d6d6d6
| 352439 ||  || — || January 10, 2008 || Mount Lemmon || Mount Lemmon Survey || — || align=right | 3.8 km || 
|-id=440 bgcolor=#fefefe
| 352440 ||  || — || January 11, 2008 || Catalina || CSS || H || align=right data-sort-value="0.71" | 710 m || 
|-id=441 bgcolor=#d6d6d6
| 352441 ||  || — || January 10, 2008 || Kitt Peak || Spacewatch || — || align=right | 3.4 km || 
|-id=442 bgcolor=#d6d6d6
| 352442 ||  || — || January 10, 2008 || Kitt Peak || Spacewatch || — || align=right | 2.3 km || 
|-id=443 bgcolor=#d6d6d6
| 352443 ||  || — || January 10, 2008 || Kitt Peak || Spacewatch || — || align=right | 2.6 km || 
|-id=444 bgcolor=#d6d6d6
| 352444 ||  || — || January 10, 2008 || Mount Lemmon || Mount Lemmon Survey || — || align=right | 4.8 km || 
|-id=445 bgcolor=#d6d6d6
| 352445 ||  || — || January 10, 2008 || Mount Lemmon || Mount Lemmon Survey || — || align=right | 3.2 km || 
|-id=446 bgcolor=#d6d6d6
| 352446 ||  || — || January 10, 2008 || Catalina || CSS || — || align=right | 4.2 km || 
|-id=447 bgcolor=#d6d6d6
| 352447 ||  || — || January 10, 2008 || Catalina || CSS || — || align=right | 4.2 km || 
|-id=448 bgcolor=#d6d6d6
| 352448 ||  || — || January 11, 2008 || Kitt Peak || Spacewatch || — || align=right | 3.5 km || 
|-id=449 bgcolor=#d6d6d6
| 352449 ||  || — || January 11, 2008 || Kitt Peak || Spacewatch || TRE || align=right | 2.9 km || 
|-id=450 bgcolor=#d6d6d6
| 352450 ||  || — || January 11, 2008 || Kitt Peak || Spacewatch || — || align=right | 3.3 km || 
|-id=451 bgcolor=#d6d6d6
| 352451 ||  || — || January 11, 2008 || Kitt Peak || Spacewatch || — || align=right | 2.8 km || 
|-id=452 bgcolor=#d6d6d6
| 352452 ||  || — || January 11, 2008 || Kitt Peak || Spacewatch || — || align=right | 2.9 km || 
|-id=453 bgcolor=#d6d6d6
| 352453 ||  || — || January 11, 2008 || Kitt Peak || Spacewatch || — || align=right | 3.1 km || 
|-id=454 bgcolor=#d6d6d6
| 352454 ||  || — || January 10, 2008 || Kitt Peak || Spacewatch || — || align=right | 3.5 km || 
|-id=455 bgcolor=#d6d6d6
| 352455 ||  || — || January 11, 2008 || Kitt Peak || Spacewatch || EOS || align=right | 2.0 km || 
|-id=456 bgcolor=#E9E9E9
| 352456 ||  || — || January 12, 2008 || Kitt Peak || Spacewatch || — || align=right | 1.8 km || 
|-id=457 bgcolor=#d6d6d6
| 352457 ||  || — || January 15, 2008 || Kitt Peak || Spacewatch || — || align=right | 2.4 km || 
|-id=458 bgcolor=#d6d6d6
| 352458 ||  || — || January 5, 2008 || Nyukasa || Mount Nyukasa Stn. || EOS || align=right | 2.3 km || 
|-id=459 bgcolor=#d6d6d6
| 352459 ||  || — || January 13, 2008 || Kitt Peak || Spacewatch || — || align=right | 3.6 km || 
|-id=460 bgcolor=#d6d6d6
| 352460 ||  || — || September 28, 2006 || Catalina || CSS || — || align=right | 2.9 km || 
|-id=461 bgcolor=#d6d6d6
| 352461 ||  || — || January 14, 2008 || Kitt Peak || Spacewatch || — || align=right | 3.4 km || 
|-id=462 bgcolor=#d6d6d6
| 352462 ||  || — || January 14, 2008 || Kitt Peak || Spacewatch || — || align=right | 2.8 km || 
|-id=463 bgcolor=#d6d6d6
| 352463 ||  || — || September 19, 2006 || Catalina || CSS || — || align=right | 3.2 km || 
|-id=464 bgcolor=#d6d6d6
| 352464 ||  || — || January 15, 2008 || Kitt Peak || Spacewatch || — || align=right | 3.4 km || 
|-id=465 bgcolor=#d6d6d6
| 352465 ||  || — || January 15, 2008 || Kitt Peak || Spacewatch || — || align=right | 3.0 km || 
|-id=466 bgcolor=#d6d6d6
| 352466 ||  || — || January 15, 2008 || Kitt Peak || Spacewatch || — || align=right | 3.0 km || 
|-id=467 bgcolor=#d6d6d6
| 352467 ||  || — || January 12, 2008 || Kitt Peak || Spacewatch || EOS || align=right | 1.8 km || 
|-id=468 bgcolor=#d6d6d6
| 352468 ||  || — || January 1, 2008 || Kitt Peak || Spacewatch || TIR || align=right | 4.0 km || 
|-id=469 bgcolor=#d6d6d6
| 352469 ||  || — || January 10, 2008 || Mount Lemmon || Mount Lemmon Survey || — || align=right | 3.1 km || 
|-id=470 bgcolor=#d6d6d6
| 352470 ||  || — || September 30, 2006 || Catalina || CSS || KAR || align=right | 1.3 km || 
|-id=471 bgcolor=#d6d6d6
| 352471 ||  || — || October 15, 2006 || Kitt Peak || Spacewatch || — || align=right | 3.0 km || 
|-id=472 bgcolor=#d6d6d6
| 352472 ||  || — || January 16, 2008 || Mount Lemmon || Mount Lemmon Survey || EOS || align=right | 2.1 km || 
|-id=473 bgcolor=#d6d6d6
| 352473 ||  || — || January 17, 2008 || Kitt Peak || Spacewatch || — || align=right | 3.7 km || 
|-id=474 bgcolor=#E9E9E9
| 352474 ||  || — || January 21, 2008 || Mount Lemmon || Mount Lemmon Survey || — || align=right | 4.5 km || 
|-id=475 bgcolor=#d6d6d6
| 352475 ||  || — || January 16, 2008 || Kitt Peak || Spacewatch || — || align=right | 2.5 km || 
|-id=476 bgcolor=#d6d6d6
| 352476 ||  || — || January 16, 2008 || Kitt Peak || Spacewatch || — || align=right | 3.7 km || 
|-id=477 bgcolor=#fefefe
| 352477 ||  || — || January 29, 2008 || La Sagra || OAM Obs. || H || align=right data-sort-value="0.93" | 930 m || 
|-id=478 bgcolor=#d6d6d6
| 352478 ||  || — || January 30, 2008 || Kitt Peak || Spacewatch || KOR || align=right | 1.8 km || 
|-id=479 bgcolor=#d6d6d6
| 352479 ||  || — || January 30, 2008 || Mount Lemmon || Mount Lemmon Survey || — || align=right | 2.5 km || 
|-id=480 bgcolor=#d6d6d6
| 352480 ||  || — || January 30, 2008 || Mount Lemmon || Mount Lemmon Survey || THM || align=right | 2.7 km || 
|-id=481 bgcolor=#d6d6d6
| 352481 ||  || — || January 30, 2008 || Kitt Peak || Spacewatch || — || align=right | 4.2 km || 
|-id=482 bgcolor=#d6d6d6
| 352482 ||  || — || January 30, 2008 || Socorro || LINEAR || — || align=right | 3.0 km || 
|-id=483 bgcolor=#d6d6d6
| 352483 ||  || — || January 30, 2008 || Catalina || CSS || — || align=right | 6.4 km || 
|-id=484 bgcolor=#d6d6d6
| 352484 ||  || — || January 16, 2008 || Kitt Peak || Spacewatch || EOS || align=right | 1.5 km || 
|-id=485 bgcolor=#d6d6d6
| 352485 ||  || — || January 30, 2008 || Mount Lemmon || Mount Lemmon Survey || — || align=right | 3.2 km || 
|-id=486 bgcolor=#d6d6d6
| 352486 ||  || — || January 30, 2008 || Mount Lemmon || Mount Lemmon Survey || KOR || align=right | 1.3 km || 
|-id=487 bgcolor=#d6d6d6
| 352487 ||  || — || January 30, 2008 || Mount Lemmon || Mount Lemmon Survey || — || align=right | 3.2 km || 
|-id=488 bgcolor=#d6d6d6
| 352488 ||  || — || January 30, 2008 || Kitt Peak || Spacewatch || — || align=right | 3.0 km || 
|-id=489 bgcolor=#d6d6d6
| 352489 ||  || — || February 2, 2008 || Kitt Peak || Spacewatch || LIX || align=right | 4.7 km || 
|-id=490 bgcolor=#d6d6d6
| 352490 ||  || — || February 2, 2008 || Mount Lemmon || Mount Lemmon Survey || — || align=right | 2.3 km || 
|-id=491 bgcolor=#fefefe
| 352491 ||  || — || February 2, 2008 || Mount Lemmon || Mount Lemmon Survey || H || align=right data-sort-value="0.84" | 840 m || 
|-id=492 bgcolor=#E9E9E9
| 352492 ||  || — || February 5, 2008 || La Sagra || OAM Obs. || — || align=right | 3.4 km || 
|-id=493 bgcolor=#d6d6d6
| 352493 ||  || — || February 2, 2008 || Kitt Peak || Spacewatch || EOS || align=right | 1.8 km || 
|-id=494 bgcolor=#d6d6d6
| 352494 ||  || — || February 2, 2008 || Kitt Peak || Spacewatch || — || align=right | 3.1 km || 
|-id=495 bgcolor=#FA8072
| 352495 ||  || — || February 3, 2008 || Catalina || CSS || H || align=right data-sort-value="0.66" | 660 m || 
|-id=496 bgcolor=#d6d6d6
| 352496 ||  || — || February 3, 2008 || Kitt Peak || Spacewatch || — || align=right | 3.2 km || 
|-id=497 bgcolor=#d6d6d6
| 352497 ||  || — || February 3, 2008 || Kitt Peak || Spacewatch || HYG || align=right | 2.8 km || 
|-id=498 bgcolor=#d6d6d6
| 352498 ||  || — || February 3, 2008 || Kitt Peak || Spacewatch || HYG || align=right | 2.4 km || 
|-id=499 bgcolor=#d6d6d6
| 352499 ||  || — || February 2, 2008 || Kitt Peak || Spacewatch || ALA || align=right | 5.2 km || 
|-id=500 bgcolor=#d6d6d6
| 352500 ||  || — || February 2, 2008 || Kitt Peak || Spacewatch || — || align=right | 2.8 km || 
|}

352501–352600 

|-bgcolor=#d6d6d6
| 352501 ||  || — || February 2, 2008 || Kitt Peak || Spacewatch || — || align=right | 4.2 km || 
|-id=502 bgcolor=#d6d6d6
| 352502 ||  || — || February 2, 2008 || Kitt Peak || Spacewatch || — || align=right | 3.5 km || 
|-id=503 bgcolor=#E9E9E9
| 352503 ||  || — || February 7, 2008 || Kitt Peak || Spacewatch || PAD || align=right | 1.8 km || 
|-id=504 bgcolor=#d6d6d6
| 352504 ||  || — || February 8, 2008 || Mount Lemmon || Mount Lemmon Survey || K-2 || align=right | 1.4 km || 
|-id=505 bgcolor=#d6d6d6
| 352505 ||  || — || February 7, 2008 || Pla D'Arguines || R. Ferrando || — || align=right | 2.9 km || 
|-id=506 bgcolor=#d6d6d6
| 352506 ||  || — || February 9, 2008 || Catalina || CSS || — || align=right | 2.6 km || 
|-id=507 bgcolor=#d6d6d6
| 352507 ||  || — || February 7, 2008 || Socorro || LINEAR || EOS || align=right | 2.5 km || 
|-id=508 bgcolor=#d6d6d6
| 352508 ||  || — || February 10, 2008 || Bergisch Gladbach || W. Bickel || — || align=right | 2.1 km || 
|-id=509 bgcolor=#d6d6d6
| 352509 ||  || — || February 10, 2008 || La Sagra || OAM Obs. || — || align=right | 3.7 km || 
|-id=510 bgcolor=#d6d6d6
| 352510 ||  || — || October 22, 2006 || Catalina || CSS || — || align=right | 2.6 km || 
|-id=511 bgcolor=#d6d6d6
| 352511 ||  || — || February 3, 2008 || Kitt Peak || Spacewatch || — || align=right | 4.2 km || 
|-id=512 bgcolor=#fefefe
| 352512 ||  || — || February 7, 2008 || Mount Lemmon || Mount Lemmon Survey || H || align=right data-sort-value="0.75" | 750 m || 
|-id=513 bgcolor=#d6d6d6
| 352513 ||  || — || February 7, 2008 || Kitt Peak || Spacewatch || EOS || align=right | 2.2 km || 
|-id=514 bgcolor=#d6d6d6
| 352514 ||  || — || February 8, 2008 || Mount Lemmon || Mount Lemmon Survey || — || align=right | 3.1 km || 
|-id=515 bgcolor=#d6d6d6
| 352515 ||  || — || February 9, 2008 || Kitt Peak || Spacewatch || — || align=right | 2.8 km || 
|-id=516 bgcolor=#d6d6d6
| 352516 ||  || — || February 9, 2008 || Kitt Peak || Spacewatch || — || align=right | 3.0 km || 
|-id=517 bgcolor=#d6d6d6
| 352517 ||  || — || February 9, 2008 || Purple Mountain || PMO NEO || — || align=right | 2.9 km || 
|-id=518 bgcolor=#d6d6d6
| 352518 ||  || — || February 10, 2008 || Kitt Peak || Spacewatch || — || align=right | 3.3 km || 
|-id=519 bgcolor=#d6d6d6
| 352519 ||  || — || February 11, 2008 || Dauban || F. Kugel || — || align=right | 4.4 km || 
|-id=520 bgcolor=#d6d6d6
| 352520 ||  || — || February 12, 2008 || Wildberg || R. Apitzsch || — || align=right | 3.3 km || 
|-id=521 bgcolor=#d6d6d6
| 352521 ||  || — || February 6, 2008 || Catalina || CSS || — || align=right | 4.0 km || 
|-id=522 bgcolor=#d6d6d6
| 352522 ||  || — || February 8, 2008 || Kitt Peak || Spacewatch || THM || align=right | 2.0 km || 
|-id=523 bgcolor=#d6d6d6
| 352523 ||  || — || February 8, 2008 || Kitt Peak || Spacewatch || — || align=right | 4.1 km || 
|-id=524 bgcolor=#d6d6d6
| 352524 ||  || — || January 15, 2008 || Mount Lemmon || Mount Lemmon Survey || — || align=right | 4.5 km || 
|-id=525 bgcolor=#d6d6d6
| 352525 ||  || — || February 8, 2008 || Kitt Peak || Spacewatch || — || align=right | 2.9 km || 
|-id=526 bgcolor=#E9E9E9
| 352526 ||  || — || February 1, 2008 || Kitt Peak || Spacewatch || — || align=right | 2.9 km || 
|-id=527 bgcolor=#d6d6d6
| 352527 ||  || — || February 9, 2008 || Kitt Peak || Spacewatch || — || align=right | 4.0 km || 
|-id=528 bgcolor=#d6d6d6
| 352528 ||  || — || February 9, 2008 || Mount Lemmon || Mount Lemmon Survey || — || align=right | 4.4 km || 
|-id=529 bgcolor=#d6d6d6
| 352529 ||  || — || February 9, 2008 || Kitt Peak || Spacewatch || — || align=right | 3.5 km || 
|-id=530 bgcolor=#d6d6d6
| 352530 ||  || — || February 9, 2008 || Kitt Peak || Spacewatch || — || align=right | 3.4 km || 
|-id=531 bgcolor=#d6d6d6
| 352531 ||  || — || February 9, 2008 || Mount Lemmon || Mount Lemmon Survey || LIX || align=right | 3.7 km || 
|-id=532 bgcolor=#d6d6d6
| 352532 ||  || — || February 9, 2008 || Mount Lemmon || Mount Lemmon Survey || — || align=right | 2.9 km || 
|-id=533 bgcolor=#d6d6d6
| 352533 ||  || — || February 10, 2008 || Mount Lemmon || Mount Lemmon Survey || — || align=right | 2.1 km || 
|-id=534 bgcolor=#fefefe
| 352534 ||  || — || February 7, 2008 || Socorro || LINEAR || H || align=right data-sort-value="0.92" | 920 m || 
|-id=535 bgcolor=#d6d6d6
| 352535 ||  || — || October 11, 2007 || Mount Lemmon || Mount Lemmon Survey || EUP || align=right | 6.5 km || 
|-id=536 bgcolor=#d6d6d6
| 352536 ||  || — || February 6, 2008 || Anderson Mesa || LONEOS || — || align=right | 4.4 km || 
|-id=537 bgcolor=#d6d6d6
| 352537 ||  || — || October 14, 2007 || Mount Lemmon || Mount Lemmon Survey || — || align=right | 3.2 km || 
|-id=538 bgcolor=#d6d6d6
| 352538 ||  || — || February 6, 2008 || Purple Mountain || PMO NEO || — || align=right | 5.8 km || 
|-id=539 bgcolor=#fefefe
| 352539 ||  || — || February 9, 2008 || Catalina || CSS || H || align=right data-sort-value="0.98" | 980 m || 
|-id=540 bgcolor=#fefefe
| 352540 ||  || — || February 9, 2008 || Catalina || CSS || H || align=right data-sort-value="0.83" | 830 m || 
|-id=541 bgcolor=#d6d6d6
| 352541 ||  || — || December 18, 2007 || Mount Lemmon || Mount Lemmon Survey || TIR || align=right | 3.4 km || 
|-id=542 bgcolor=#fefefe
| 352542 ||  || — || February 1, 2008 || Kitt Peak || Spacewatch || H || align=right data-sort-value="0.83" | 830 m || 
|-id=543 bgcolor=#d6d6d6
| 352543 ||  || — || February 2, 2008 || Kitt Peak || Spacewatch || — || align=right | 4.5 km || 
|-id=544 bgcolor=#d6d6d6
| 352544 ||  || — || February 7, 2008 || Mount Lemmon || Mount Lemmon Survey || VER || align=right | 3.1 km || 
|-id=545 bgcolor=#d6d6d6
| 352545 ||  || — || February 8, 2008 || Kitt Peak || Spacewatch || — || align=right | 2.1 km || 
|-id=546 bgcolor=#d6d6d6
| 352546 ||  || — || February 7, 2008 || Mount Lemmon || Mount Lemmon Survey || — || align=right | 3.3 km || 
|-id=547 bgcolor=#d6d6d6
| 352547 ||  || — || February 10, 2008 || Mount Lemmon || Mount Lemmon Survey || — || align=right | 3.7 km || 
|-id=548 bgcolor=#d6d6d6
| 352548 ||  || — || February 13, 2008 || Kitt Peak || Spacewatch || — || align=right | 3.3 km || 
|-id=549 bgcolor=#d6d6d6
| 352549 ||  || — || February 3, 2008 || Kitt Peak || Spacewatch || — || align=right | 3.8 km || 
|-id=550 bgcolor=#d6d6d6
| 352550 ||  || — || February 13, 2008 || Kitt Peak || Spacewatch || — || align=right | 4.9 km || 
|-id=551 bgcolor=#d6d6d6
| 352551 ||  || — || February 12, 2008 || Kitt Peak || Spacewatch || — || align=right | 2.8 km || 
|-id=552 bgcolor=#d6d6d6
| 352552 ||  || — || February 6, 2008 || Catalina || CSS || — || align=right | 4.7 km || 
|-id=553 bgcolor=#d6d6d6
| 352553 ||  || — || February 2, 2008 || Kitt Peak || Spacewatch || — || align=right | 2.7 km || 
|-id=554 bgcolor=#d6d6d6
| 352554 ||  || — || February 6, 2008 || Catalina || CSS || — || align=right | 3.6 km || 
|-id=555 bgcolor=#d6d6d6
| 352555 ||  || — || February 8, 2008 || Mount Lemmon || Mount Lemmon Survey || — || align=right | 3.1 km || 
|-id=556 bgcolor=#E9E9E9
| 352556 ||  || — || February 9, 2008 || Kitt Peak || Spacewatch || — || align=right | 3.0 km || 
|-id=557 bgcolor=#d6d6d6
| 352557 ||  || — || February 9, 2008 || Kitt Peak || Spacewatch || — || align=right | 2.9 km || 
|-id=558 bgcolor=#d6d6d6
| 352558 ||  || — || February 9, 2008 || Mount Lemmon || Mount Lemmon Survey || HYG || align=right | 2.9 km || 
|-id=559 bgcolor=#d6d6d6
| 352559 ||  || — || February 10, 2008 || Kitt Peak || Spacewatch || THM || align=right | 2.6 km || 
|-id=560 bgcolor=#d6d6d6
| 352560 ||  || — || February 11, 2008 || Mount Lemmon || Mount Lemmon Survey || EOS || align=right | 2.5 km || 
|-id=561 bgcolor=#d6d6d6
| 352561 ||  || — || February 12, 2008 || Mount Lemmon || Mount Lemmon Survey || — || align=right | 4.2 km || 
|-id=562 bgcolor=#d6d6d6
| 352562 ||  || — || February 24, 2008 || Kitt Peak || Spacewatch || — || align=right | 1.8 km || 
|-id=563 bgcolor=#d6d6d6
| 352563 ||  || — || February 24, 2008 || Mount Lemmon || Mount Lemmon Survey || — || align=right | 2.0 km || 
|-id=564 bgcolor=#fefefe
| 352564 ||  || — || February 25, 2008 || Mount Lemmon || Mount Lemmon Survey || H || align=right data-sort-value="0.72" | 720 m || 
|-id=565 bgcolor=#d6d6d6
| 352565 ||  || — || February 26, 2008 || Kitt Peak || Spacewatch || THM || align=right | 2.6 km || 
|-id=566 bgcolor=#d6d6d6
| 352566 ||  || — || February 26, 2008 || Kitt Peak || Spacewatch || HYG || align=right | 3.1 km || 
|-id=567 bgcolor=#d6d6d6
| 352567 ||  || — || February 26, 2008 || Mount Lemmon || Mount Lemmon Survey || — || align=right | 2.5 km || 
|-id=568 bgcolor=#fefefe
| 352568 ||  || — || February 26, 2008 || Kitt Peak || Spacewatch || H || align=right data-sort-value="0.84" | 840 m || 
|-id=569 bgcolor=#d6d6d6
| 352569 ||  || — || December 30, 2007 || Mount Lemmon || Mount Lemmon Survey || — || align=right | 3.1 km || 
|-id=570 bgcolor=#d6d6d6
| 352570 ||  || — || February 28, 2008 || Mount Lemmon || Mount Lemmon Survey || BRA || align=right | 1.4 km || 
|-id=571 bgcolor=#d6d6d6
| 352571 ||  || — || February 28, 2008 || Catalina || CSS || — || align=right | 4.2 km || 
|-id=572 bgcolor=#fefefe
| 352572 ||  || — || February 10, 2008 || Catalina || CSS || LCI || align=right | 1.3 km || 
|-id=573 bgcolor=#d6d6d6
| 352573 ||  || — || February 24, 2008 || Kitt Peak || Spacewatch || — || align=right | 3.8 km || 
|-id=574 bgcolor=#d6d6d6
| 352574 ||  || — || February 28, 2008 || Mount Lemmon || Mount Lemmon Survey || — || align=right | 4.0 km || 
|-id=575 bgcolor=#fefefe
| 352575 ||  || — || February 27, 2008 || Anderson Mesa || LONEOS || H || align=right data-sort-value="0.98" | 980 m || 
|-id=576 bgcolor=#d6d6d6
| 352576 ||  || — || February 29, 2008 || Catalina || CSS || — || align=right | 3.2 km || 
|-id=577 bgcolor=#d6d6d6
| 352577 ||  || — || February 26, 2008 || Kitt Peak || Spacewatch || — || align=right | 3.3 km || 
|-id=578 bgcolor=#d6d6d6
| 352578 ||  || — || February 26, 2008 || Mount Lemmon || Mount Lemmon Survey || — || align=right | 2.9 km || 
|-id=579 bgcolor=#d6d6d6
| 352579 ||  || — || February 27, 2008 || Kitt Peak || Spacewatch || EOS || align=right | 1.6 km || 
|-id=580 bgcolor=#d6d6d6
| 352580 ||  || — || February 28, 2008 || Kitt Peak || Spacewatch || HYG || align=right | 3.1 km || 
|-id=581 bgcolor=#d6d6d6
| 352581 ||  || — || February 28, 2008 || Catalina || CSS || — || align=right | 4.1 km || 
|-id=582 bgcolor=#fefefe
| 352582 ||  || — || February 18, 2008 || Catalina || CSS || H || align=right data-sort-value="0.96" | 960 m || 
|-id=583 bgcolor=#d6d6d6
| 352583 ||  || — || February 26, 2008 || Kitt Peak || Spacewatch || — || align=right | 3.6 km || 
|-id=584 bgcolor=#d6d6d6
| 352584 ||  || — || February 28, 2008 || Mount Lemmon || Mount Lemmon Survey || — || align=right | 2.9 km || 
|-id=585 bgcolor=#d6d6d6
| 352585 ||  || — || March 3, 2008 || La Sagra || OAM Obs. || — || align=right | 3.6 km || 
|-id=586 bgcolor=#d6d6d6
| 352586 ||  || — || April 27, 2003 || Anderson Mesa || LONEOS || — || align=right | 3.3 km || 
|-id=587 bgcolor=#d6d6d6
| 352587 ||  || — || March 1, 2008 || Kitt Peak || Spacewatch || — || align=right | 2.9 km || 
|-id=588 bgcolor=#d6d6d6
| 352588 ||  || — || March 2, 2008 || Kitt Peak || Spacewatch || — || align=right | 3.7 km || 
|-id=589 bgcolor=#d6d6d6
| 352589 ||  || — || March 2, 2008 || Kitt Peak || Spacewatch || — || align=right | 4.2 km || 
|-id=590 bgcolor=#d6d6d6
| 352590 ||  || — || March 3, 2008 || Catalina || CSS || — || align=right | 4.3 km || 
|-id=591 bgcolor=#d6d6d6
| 352591 ||  || — || February 18, 2008 || Mount Lemmon || Mount Lemmon Survey || — || align=right | 3.3 km || 
|-id=592 bgcolor=#d6d6d6
| 352592 ||  || — || March 4, 2008 || Mount Lemmon || Mount Lemmon Survey || URS || align=right | 3.7 km || 
|-id=593 bgcolor=#d6d6d6
| 352593 ||  || — || March 4, 2008 || Mount Lemmon || Mount Lemmon Survey || — || align=right | 3.1 km || 
|-id=594 bgcolor=#d6d6d6
| 352594 ||  || — || March 4, 2008 || Catalina || CSS || — || align=right | 2.8 km || 
|-id=595 bgcolor=#d6d6d6
| 352595 ||  || — || March 4, 2008 || Mount Lemmon || Mount Lemmon Survey || — || align=right | 2.9 km || 
|-id=596 bgcolor=#d6d6d6
| 352596 ||  || — || March 6, 2008 || Kitt Peak || Spacewatch || — || align=right | 2.0 km || 
|-id=597 bgcolor=#d6d6d6
| 352597 ||  || — || March 6, 2008 || Kitt Peak || Spacewatch || HYG || align=right | 3.0 km || 
|-id=598 bgcolor=#d6d6d6
| 352598 ||  || — || March 6, 2008 || Kitt Peak || Spacewatch || — || align=right | 3.1 km || 
|-id=599 bgcolor=#d6d6d6
| 352599 ||  || — || March 7, 2008 || Mount Lemmon || Mount Lemmon Survey || HYG || align=right | 2.3 km || 
|-id=600 bgcolor=#d6d6d6
| 352600 ||  || — || March 7, 2008 || Mount Lemmon || Mount Lemmon Survey || THM || align=right | 1.8 km || 
|}

352601–352700 

|-bgcolor=#d6d6d6
| 352601 ||  || — || March 7, 2008 || Catalina || CSS || — || align=right | 2.6 km || 
|-id=602 bgcolor=#d6d6d6
| 352602 ||  || — || March 7, 2008 || Kitt Peak || Spacewatch || — || align=right | 3.2 km || 
|-id=603 bgcolor=#d6d6d6
| 352603 ||  || — || March 8, 2008 || Catalina || CSS || — || align=right | 3.3 km || 
|-id=604 bgcolor=#d6d6d6
| 352604 ||  || — || March 10, 2008 || Catalina || CSS || — || align=right | 3.3 km || 
|-id=605 bgcolor=#d6d6d6
| 352605 ||  || — || March 14, 2008 || Socorro || LINEAR || — || align=right | 5.1 km || 
|-id=606 bgcolor=#d6d6d6
| 352606 ||  || — || March 2, 2008 || Mount Lemmon || Mount Lemmon Survey || TIR || align=right | 3.2 km || 
|-id=607 bgcolor=#d6d6d6
| 352607 ||  || — || March 6, 2008 || Catalina || CSS || — || align=right | 4.9 km || 
|-id=608 bgcolor=#d6d6d6
| 352608 ||  || — || March 3, 2008 || Mount Lemmon || Mount Lemmon Survey || — || align=right | 3.8 km || 
|-id=609 bgcolor=#d6d6d6
| 352609 ||  || — || March 3, 2008 || Purple Mountain || PMO NEO || 7:4 || align=right | 5.3 km || 
|-id=610 bgcolor=#d6d6d6
| 352610 ||  || — || March 7, 2008 || Mount Lemmon || Mount Lemmon Survey || — || align=right | 2.6 km || 
|-id=611 bgcolor=#d6d6d6
| 352611 ||  || — || February 11, 2008 || Mount Lemmon || Mount Lemmon Survey || LUT || align=right | 4.9 km || 
|-id=612 bgcolor=#d6d6d6
| 352612 ||  || — || February 28, 2008 || Kitt Peak || Spacewatch || — || align=right | 3.3 km || 
|-id=613 bgcolor=#d6d6d6
| 352613 ||  || — || March 11, 2008 || Catalina || CSS || — || align=right | 7.5 km || 
|-id=614 bgcolor=#d6d6d6
| 352614 ||  || — || March 5, 2008 || Mount Lemmon || Mount Lemmon Survey || — || align=right | 3.9 km || 
|-id=615 bgcolor=#d6d6d6
| 352615 ||  || — || March 10, 2008 || Kitt Peak || Spacewatch || — || align=right | 3.8 km || 
|-id=616 bgcolor=#d6d6d6
| 352616 ||  || — || March 13, 2008 || Catalina || CSS || — || align=right | 4.7 km || 
|-id=617 bgcolor=#d6d6d6
| 352617 ||  || — || March 25, 2008 || Kitt Peak || Spacewatch || — || align=right | 3.1 km || 
|-id=618 bgcolor=#d6d6d6
| 352618 ||  || — || March 25, 2008 || Kitt Peak || Spacewatch || — || align=right | 3.7 km || 
|-id=619 bgcolor=#d6d6d6
| 352619 ||  || — || March 25, 2008 || Kitt Peak || Spacewatch || — || align=right | 2.3 km || 
|-id=620 bgcolor=#d6d6d6
| 352620 ||  || — || March 25, 2008 || Kitt Peak || Spacewatch || 637 || align=right | 2.2 km || 
|-id=621 bgcolor=#fefefe
| 352621 ||  || — || March 30, 2008 || Catalina || CSS || H || align=right | 1.2 km || 
|-id=622 bgcolor=#d6d6d6
| 352622 ||  || — || March 30, 2008 || Skylive || F. Tozzi || THB || align=right | 4.2 km || 
|-id=623 bgcolor=#fefefe
| 352623 ||  || — || March 30, 2008 || Catalina || CSS || H || align=right data-sort-value="0.90" | 900 m || 
|-id=624 bgcolor=#d6d6d6
| 352624 ||  || — || February 26, 2008 || Mount Lemmon || Mount Lemmon Survey || — || align=right | 2.7 km || 
|-id=625 bgcolor=#d6d6d6
| 352625 ||  || — || March 27, 2008 || Mount Lemmon || Mount Lemmon Survey || — || align=right | 3.0 km || 
|-id=626 bgcolor=#d6d6d6
| 352626 ||  || — || March 28, 2008 || Mount Lemmon || Mount Lemmon Survey || HYG || align=right | 2.7 km || 
|-id=627 bgcolor=#d6d6d6
| 352627 ||  || — || March 28, 2008 || Kitt Peak || Spacewatch || — || align=right | 3.4 km || 
|-id=628 bgcolor=#d6d6d6
| 352628 ||  || — || March 28, 2008 || Kitt Peak || Spacewatch || — || align=right | 3.4 km || 
|-id=629 bgcolor=#d6d6d6
| 352629 ||  || — || March 27, 2008 || Mount Lemmon || Mount Lemmon Survey || — || align=right | 3.0 km || 
|-id=630 bgcolor=#d6d6d6
| 352630 ||  || — || March 29, 2008 || Mount Lemmon || Mount Lemmon Survey || — || align=right | 2.2 km || 
|-id=631 bgcolor=#d6d6d6
| 352631 ||  || — || March 31, 2008 || Mount Lemmon || Mount Lemmon Survey || — || align=right | 2.7 km || 
|-id=632 bgcolor=#d6d6d6
| 352632 ||  || — || March 30, 2008 || Črni Vrh || Črni Vrh || EUP || align=right | 3.6 km || 
|-id=633 bgcolor=#fefefe
| 352633 ||  || — || April 3, 2008 || Kitt Peak || Spacewatch || H || align=right data-sort-value="0.80" | 800 m || 
|-id=634 bgcolor=#fefefe
| 352634 ||  || — || April 5, 2008 || Catalina || CSS || H || align=right data-sort-value="0.91" | 910 m || 
|-id=635 bgcolor=#d6d6d6
| 352635 ||  || — || April 6, 2008 || Kitt Peak || Spacewatch || SYL7:4 || align=right | 3.3 km || 
|-id=636 bgcolor=#d6d6d6
| 352636 ||  || — || April 6, 2008 || Mount Lemmon || Mount Lemmon Survey || — || align=right | 3.3 km || 
|-id=637 bgcolor=#d6d6d6
| 352637 ||  || — || April 13, 2008 || Kitt Peak || Spacewatch || 7:4 || align=right | 4.5 km || 
|-id=638 bgcolor=#fefefe
| 352638 ||  || — || April 3, 2008 || Catalina || CSS || H || align=right data-sort-value="0.86" | 860 m || 
|-id=639 bgcolor=#fefefe
| 352639 ||  || — || April 3, 2008 || Catalina || CSS || H || align=right | 1.0 km || 
|-id=640 bgcolor=#d6d6d6
| 352640 ||  || — || April 12, 2008 || Dauban || F. Kugel || EUP || align=right | 3.8 km || 
|-id=641 bgcolor=#fefefe
| 352641 ||  || — || April 30, 2008 || Kitt Peak || Spacewatch || FLO || align=right data-sort-value="0.67" | 670 m || 
|-id=642 bgcolor=#fefefe
| 352642 ||  || — || May 2, 2008 || Catalina || CSS || H || align=right data-sort-value="0.93" | 930 m || 
|-id=643 bgcolor=#d6d6d6
| 352643 ||  || — || May 5, 2008 || Mount Lemmon || Mount Lemmon Survey || — || align=right | 3.5 km || 
|-id=644 bgcolor=#fefefe
| 352644 ||  || — || May 29, 2008 || Kitt Peak || Spacewatch || — || align=right data-sort-value="0.81" | 810 m || 
|-id=645 bgcolor=#d6d6d6
| 352645 ||  || — || June 1, 2008 || Kitt Peak || Spacewatch || THB || align=right | 2.4 km || 
|-id=646 bgcolor=#fefefe
| 352646 Blumbahs ||  ||  || July 25, 2008 || Baldone || K. Černis, I. Eglītis || — || align=right data-sort-value="0.85" | 850 m || 
|-id=647 bgcolor=#fefefe
| 352647 ||  || — || July 31, 2008 || La Sagra || OAM Obs. || — || align=right data-sort-value="0.88" | 880 m || 
|-id=648 bgcolor=#fefefe
| 352648 ||  || — || July 30, 2008 || Kitt Peak || Spacewatch || — || align=right data-sort-value="0.75" | 750 m || 
|-id=649 bgcolor=#C2FFFF
| 352649 ||  || — || July 29, 2008 || Kitt Peak || Spacewatch || L4 || align=right | 9.3 km || 
|-id=650 bgcolor=#fefefe
| 352650 ||  || — || August 7, 2008 || Dauban || F. Kugel || — || align=right data-sort-value="0.73" | 730 m || 
|-id=651 bgcolor=#fefefe
| 352651 ||  || — || August 25, 2008 || La Sagra || OAM Obs. || — || align=right data-sort-value="0.77" | 770 m || 
|-id=652 bgcolor=#fefefe
| 352652 ||  || — || August 26, 2008 || Dauban || F. Kugel || — || align=right | 1.1 km || 
|-id=653 bgcolor=#fefefe
| 352653 ||  || — || August 27, 2008 || La Sagra || OAM Obs. || — || align=right data-sort-value="0.74" | 740 m || 
|-id=654 bgcolor=#fefefe
| 352654 ||  || — || August 25, 2008 || Andrushivka || Andrushivka Obs. || FLO || align=right data-sort-value="0.71" | 710 m || 
|-id=655 bgcolor=#C2FFFF
| 352655 ||  || — || August 31, 2008 || Moletai || Molėtai Obs. || L4 || align=right | 12 km || 
|-id=656 bgcolor=#fefefe
| 352656 ||  || — || August 24, 2008 || La Sagra || OAM Obs. || — || align=right data-sort-value="0.69" | 690 m || 
|-id=657 bgcolor=#fefefe
| 352657 ||  || — || August 27, 2008 || La Sagra || OAM Obs. || — || align=right | 1.0 km || 
|-id=658 bgcolor=#fefefe
| 352658 ||  || — || August 28, 2008 || La Sagra || OAM Obs. || MAS || align=right data-sort-value="0.93" | 930 m || 
|-id=659 bgcolor=#C2FFFF
| 352659 ||  || — || September 2, 2008 || Kitt Peak || Spacewatch || L4 || align=right | 12 km || 
|-id=660 bgcolor=#fefefe
| 352660 ||  || — || September 2, 2008 || Kitt Peak || Spacewatch || NYS || align=right data-sort-value="0.60" | 600 m || 
|-id=661 bgcolor=#fefefe
| 352661 ||  || — || September 2, 2008 || Kitt Peak || Spacewatch || — || align=right data-sort-value="0.78" | 780 m || 
|-id=662 bgcolor=#C2FFFF
| 352662 ||  || — || September 4, 2008 || Kitt Peak || Spacewatch || L4ERY || align=right | 10 km || 
|-id=663 bgcolor=#fefefe
| 352663 ||  || — || September 4, 2008 || Kitt Peak || Spacewatch || — || align=right data-sort-value="0.76" | 760 m || 
|-id=664 bgcolor=#fefefe
| 352664 ||  || — || September 4, 2008 || Socorro || LINEAR || — || align=right | 1.0 km || 
|-id=665 bgcolor=#fefefe
| 352665 ||  || — || September 3, 2008 || Kitt Peak || Spacewatch || — || align=right data-sort-value="0.76" | 760 m || 
|-id=666 bgcolor=#C2FFFF
| 352666 ||  || — || September 3, 2008 || Kitt Peak || Spacewatch || L4 || align=right | 8.6 km || 
|-id=667 bgcolor=#fefefe
| 352667 ||  || — || September 4, 2008 || Kitt Peak || Spacewatch || FLO || align=right data-sort-value="0.75" | 750 m || 
|-id=668 bgcolor=#C2FFFF
| 352668 ||  || — || September 6, 2008 || Mount Lemmon || Mount Lemmon Survey || L4ERY || align=right | 11 km || 
|-id=669 bgcolor=#fefefe
| 352669 ||  || — || September 6, 2008 || Catalina || CSS || NYS || align=right data-sort-value="0.87" | 870 m || 
|-id=670 bgcolor=#fefefe
| 352670 ||  || — || September 5, 2008 || Kitt Peak || Spacewatch || — || align=right data-sort-value="0.83" | 830 m || 
|-id=671 bgcolor=#C2FFFF
| 352671 ||  || — || September 7, 2008 || Mount Lemmon || Mount Lemmon Survey || L4 || align=right | 8.9 km || 
|-id=672 bgcolor=#fefefe
| 352672 ||  || — || September 2, 2008 || Kitt Peak || Spacewatch || — || align=right data-sort-value="0.68" | 680 m || 
|-id=673 bgcolor=#fefefe
| 352673 ||  || — || September 5, 2008 || Kitt Peak || Spacewatch || — || align=right data-sort-value="0.84" | 840 m || 
|-id=674 bgcolor=#fefefe
| 352674 ||  || — || September 2, 2008 || Kitt Peak || Spacewatch || MAS || align=right data-sort-value="0.74" | 740 m || 
|-id=675 bgcolor=#fefefe
| 352675 ||  || — || September 7, 2008 || Mount Lemmon || Mount Lemmon Survey || — || align=right data-sort-value="0.88" | 880 m || 
|-id=676 bgcolor=#fefefe
| 352676 ||  || — || September 7, 2008 || Mount Lemmon || Mount Lemmon Survey || V || align=right data-sort-value="0.64" | 640 m || 
|-id=677 bgcolor=#fefefe
| 352677 ||  || — || September 8, 2008 || Mount Lemmon || Mount Lemmon Survey || — || align=right | 1.0 km || 
|-id=678 bgcolor=#fefefe
| 352678 ||  || — || September 2, 2008 || Kitt Peak || Spacewatch || MAS || align=right data-sort-value="0.57" | 570 m || 
|-id=679 bgcolor=#fefefe
| 352679 ||  || — || September 4, 2008 || Kitt Peak || Spacewatch || FLO || align=right data-sort-value="0.64" | 640 m || 
|-id=680 bgcolor=#fefefe
| 352680 ||  || — || September 4, 2008 || Kitt Peak || Spacewatch || — || align=right data-sort-value="0.82" | 820 m || 
|-id=681 bgcolor=#fefefe
| 352681 ||  || — || September 22, 2008 || Socorro || LINEAR || FLO || align=right data-sort-value="0.81" | 810 m || 
|-id=682 bgcolor=#fefefe
| 352682 ||  || — || September 22, 2008 || Socorro || LINEAR || — || align=right data-sort-value="0.81" | 810 m || 
|-id=683 bgcolor=#fefefe
| 352683 ||  || — || September 22, 2008 || Socorro || LINEAR || — || align=right | 1.00 km || 
|-id=684 bgcolor=#fefefe
| 352684 ||  || — || September 22, 2008 || Socorro || LINEAR || — || align=right data-sort-value="0.85" | 850 m || 
|-id=685 bgcolor=#fefefe
| 352685 ||  || — || September 19, 2008 || Kitt Peak || Spacewatch || V || align=right data-sort-value="0.81" | 810 m || 
|-id=686 bgcolor=#fefefe
| 352686 ||  || — || September 19, 2008 || Kitt Peak || Spacewatch || NYS || align=right data-sort-value="0.75" | 750 m || 
|-id=687 bgcolor=#fefefe
| 352687 ||  || — || September 20, 2008 || Kitt Peak || Spacewatch || MAS || align=right data-sort-value="0.90" | 900 m || 
|-id=688 bgcolor=#fefefe
| 352688 ||  || — || September 20, 2008 || Kitt Peak || Spacewatch || V || align=right data-sort-value="0.61" | 610 m || 
|-id=689 bgcolor=#fefefe
| 352689 ||  || — || September 20, 2008 || Catalina || CSS || — || align=right data-sort-value="0.88" | 880 m || 
|-id=690 bgcolor=#fefefe
| 352690 ||  || — || September 23, 2008 || Mount Lemmon || Mount Lemmon Survey || FLO || align=right data-sort-value="0.74" | 740 m || 
|-id=691 bgcolor=#fefefe
| 352691 ||  || — || September 27, 2008 || Sierra Stars || F. Tozzi || NYS || align=right data-sort-value="0.79" | 790 m || 
|-id=692 bgcolor=#C2FFFF
| 352692 ||  || — || September 19, 2008 || Kitt Peak || Spacewatch || L4 || align=right | 9.5 km || 
|-id=693 bgcolor=#fefefe
| 352693 ||  || — || September 20, 2008 || Kitt Peak || Spacewatch || FLO || align=right data-sort-value="0.76" | 760 m || 
|-id=694 bgcolor=#fefefe
| 352694 ||  || — || September 21, 2008 || Kitt Peak || Spacewatch || CIM || align=right | 2.2 km || 
|-id=695 bgcolor=#fefefe
| 352695 ||  || — || September 21, 2008 || Kitt Peak || Spacewatch || — || align=right | 1.2 km || 
|-id=696 bgcolor=#fefefe
| 352696 ||  || — || September 21, 2008 || Kitt Peak || Spacewatch || — || align=right data-sort-value="0.75" | 750 m || 
|-id=697 bgcolor=#fefefe
| 352697 ||  || — || September 21, 2008 || Kitt Peak || Spacewatch || V || align=right data-sort-value="0.59" | 590 m || 
|-id=698 bgcolor=#fefefe
| 352698 ||  || — || September 21, 2008 || Kitt Peak || Spacewatch || — || align=right data-sort-value="0.97" | 970 m || 
|-id=699 bgcolor=#fefefe
| 352699 ||  || — || September 22, 2008 || Mount Lemmon || Mount Lemmon Survey || MAS || align=right data-sort-value="0.81" | 810 m || 
|-id=700 bgcolor=#fefefe
| 352700 ||  || — || September 22, 2008 || Mount Lemmon || Mount Lemmon Survey || V || align=right data-sort-value="0.75" | 750 m || 
|}

352701–352800 

|-bgcolor=#E9E9E9
| 352701 ||  || — || December 3, 2005 || Mauna Kea || A. Boattini || — || align=right | 1.4 km || 
|-id=702 bgcolor=#fefefe
| 352702 ||  || — || September 23, 2008 || Kitt Peak || Spacewatch || — || align=right data-sort-value="0.83" | 830 m || 
|-id=703 bgcolor=#fefefe
| 352703 ||  || — || September 29, 2008 || Dauban || F. Kugel || NYS || align=right data-sort-value="0.61" | 610 m || 
|-id=704 bgcolor=#fefefe
| 352704 ||  || — || September 26, 2008 || Charleston || ARO || FLO || align=right data-sort-value="0.55" | 550 m || 
|-id=705 bgcolor=#fefefe
| 352705 ||  || — || September 28, 2008 || Taunus || E. Schwab, R. Kling || — || align=right data-sort-value="0.85" | 850 m || 
|-id=706 bgcolor=#fefefe
| 352706 ||  || — || September 24, 2008 || Kitt Peak || Spacewatch || — || align=right data-sort-value="0.58" | 580 m || 
|-id=707 bgcolor=#fefefe
| 352707 ||  || — || September 24, 2008 || Mount Lemmon || Mount Lemmon Survey || FLO || align=right data-sort-value="0.71" | 710 m || 
|-id=708 bgcolor=#E9E9E9
| 352708 ||  || — || September 24, 2008 || Mount Lemmon || Mount Lemmon Survey || — || align=right | 1.6 km || 
|-id=709 bgcolor=#fefefe
| 352709 ||  || — || September 25, 2008 || Kitt Peak || Spacewatch || NYS || align=right data-sort-value="0.73" | 730 m || 
|-id=710 bgcolor=#fefefe
| 352710 ||  || — || September 25, 2008 || Kitt Peak || Spacewatch || — || align=right data-sort-value="0.64" | 640 m || 
|-id=711 bgcolor=#fefefe
| 352711 ||  || — || September 25, 2008 || Kitt Peak || Spacewatch || — || align=right data-sort-value="0.95" | 950 m || 
|-id=712 bgcolor=#fefefe
| 352712 ||  || — || September 25, 2008 || Mount Lemmon || Mount Lemmon Survey || FLO || align=right data-sort-value="0.68" | 680 m || 
|-id=713 bgcolor=#d6d6d6
| 352713 ||  || — || September 25, 2008 || Kitt Peak || Spacewatch || — || align=right | 2.7 km || 
|-id=714 bgcolor=#fefefe
| 352714 ||  || — || September 25, 2008 || Kitt Peak || Spacewatch || V || align=right data-sort-value="0.82" | 820 m || 
|-id=715 bgcolor=#fefefe
| 352715 ||  || — || September 26, 2008 || Kitt Peak || Spacewatch || — || align=right data-sort-value="0.78" | 780 m || 
|-id=716 bgcolor=#fefefe
| 352716 ||  || — || September 28, 2008 || Catalina || CSS || V || align=right data-sort-value="0.71" | 710 m || 
|-id=717 bgcolor=#E9E9E9
| 352717 ||  || — || September 28, 2008 || Kitt Peak || Spacewatch || — || align=right | 1.3 km || 
|-id=718 bgcolor=#fefefe
| 352718 ||  || — || September 29, 2008 || Mount Lemmon || Mount Lemmon Survey || V || align=right data-sort-value="0.60" | 600 m || 
|-id=719 bgcolor=#fefefe
| 352719 ||  || — || September 30, 2008 || La Sagra || OAM Obs. || — || align=right data-sort-value="0.85" | 850 m || 
|-id=720 bgcolor=#fefefe
| 352720 ||  || — || September 25, 2008 || Mount Lemmon || Mount Lemmon Survey || FLO || align=right data-sort-value="0.54" | 540 m || 
|-id=721 bgcolor=#fefefe
| 352721 ||  || — || September 26, 2008 || Kitt Peak || Spacewatch || MAS || align=right data-sort-value="0.60" | 600 m || 
|-id=722 bgcolor=#fefefe
| 352722 ||  || — || September 29, 2008 || Kitt Peak || Spacewatch || — || align=right data-sort-value="0.86" | 860 m || 
|-id=723 bgcolor=#fefefe
| 352723 ||  || — || September 23, 2008 || Mount Lemmon || Mount Lemmon Survey || — || align=right data-sort-value="0.77" | 770 m || 
|-id=724 bgcolor=#fefefe
| 352724 ||  || — || September 23, 2008 || Mount Lemmon || Mount Lemmon Survey || MAS || align=right data-sort-value="0.75" | 750 m || 
|-id=725 bgcolor=#fefefe
| 352725 ||  || — || September 21, 2008 || Kitt Peak || Spacewatch || — || align=right data-sort-value="0.94" | 940 m || 
|-id=726 bgcolor=#fefefe
| 352726 ||  || — || September 23, 2008 || Kitt Peak || Spacewatch || — || align=right data-sort-value="0.73" | 730 m || 
|-id=727 bgcolor=#fefefe
| 352727 ||  || — || September 24, 2008 || Kitt Peak || Spacewatch || — || align=right data-sort-value="0.69" | 690 m || 
|-id=728 bgcolor=#fefefe
| 352728 ||  || — || September 24, 2008 || Kitt Peak || Spacewatch || FLO || align=right data-sort-value="0.64" | 640 m || 
|-id=729 bgcolor=#fefefe
| 352729 ||  || — || September 25, 2008 || Kitt Peak || Spacewatch || NYS || align=right data-sort-value="0.54" | 540 m || 
|-id=730 bgcolor=#fefefe
| 352730 ||  || — || September 20, 2008 || Catalina || CSS || V || align=right data-sort-value="0.71" | 710 m || 
|-id=731 bgcolor=#fefefe
| 352731 ||  || — || September 20, 2008 || Catalina || CSS || FLO || align=right data-sort-value="0.77" | 770 m || 
|-id=732 bgcolor=#fefefe
| 352732 ||  || — || August 29, 2008 || Lulin || Lulin Obs. || — || align=right data-sort-value="0.87" | 870 m || 
|-id=733 bgcolor=#fefefe
| 352733 ||  || — || September 23, 2008 || Kitt Peak || Spacewatch || FLO || align=right data-sort-value="0.78" | 780 m || 
|-id=734 bgcolor=#fefefe
| 352734 ||  || — || September 23, 2008 || Kitt Peak || Spacewatch || ERI || align=right | 1.6 km || 
|-id=735 bgcolor=#FA8072
| 352735 ||  || — || September 23, 2008 || Socorro || LINEAR || — || align=right data-sort-value="0.86" | 860 m || 
|-id=736 bgcolor=#fefefe
| 352736 ||  || — || September 24, 2008 || Mount Lemmon || Mount Lemmon Survey || — || align=right | 1.0 km || 
|-id=737 bgcolor=#fefefe
| 352737 ||  || — || October 1, 2008 || Mount Lemmon || Mount Lemmon Survey || — || align=right data-sort-value="0.58" | 580 m || 
|-id=738 bgcolor=#fefefe
| 352738 ||  || — || October 1, 2008 || Mount Lemmon || Mount Lemmon Survey || — || align=right data-sort-value="0.84" | 840 m || 
|-id=739 bgcolor=#fefefe
| 352739 ||  || — || October 2, 2008 || Kitt Peak || Spacewatch || — || align=right | 1.5 km || 
|-id=740 bgcolor=#E9E9E9
| 352740 ||  || — || October 2, 2008 || Catalina || CSS || RAF || align=right | 1.1 km || 
|-id=741 bgcolor=#fefefe
| 352741 ||  || — || October 2, 2008 || Kitt Peak || Spacewatch || NYS || align=right data-sort-value="0.59" | 590 m || 
|-id=742 bgcolor=#fefefe
| 352742 ||  || — || October 2, 2008 || Kitt Peak || Spacewatch || FLO || align=right data-sort-value="0.64" | 640 m || 
|-id=743 bgcolor=#fefefe
| 352743 ||  || — || October 2, 2008 || Kitt Peak || Spacewatch || — || align=right data-sort-value="0.90" | 900 m || 
|-id=744 bgcolor=#fefefe
| 352744 ||  || — || October 3, 2008 || La Sagra || OAM Obs. || — || align=right | 1.2 km || 
|-id=745 bgcolor=#fefefe
| 352745 ||  || — || October 6, 2008 || Kitt Peak || Spacewatch || — || align=right data-sort-value="0.85" | 850 m || 
|-id=746 bgcolor=#fefefe
| 352746 ||  || — || October 6, 2008 || Kitt Peak || Spacewatch || — || align=right data-sort-value="0.67" | 670 m || 
|-id=747 bgcolor=#fefefe
| 352747 ||  || — || December 8, 2005 || Kitt Peak || Spacewatch || — || align=right data-sort-value="0.68" | 680 m || 
|-id=748 bgcolor=#fefefe
| 352748 ||  || — || October 6, 2008 || Catalina || CSS || — || align=right data-sort-value="0.93" | 930 m || 
|-id=749 bgcolor=#fefefe
| 352749 ||  || — || October 6, 2008 || Mount Lemmon || Mount Lemmon Survey || NYS || align=right data-sort-value="0.66" | 660 m || 
|-id=750 bgcolor=#fefefe
| 352750 ||  || — || October 6, 2008 || Kitt Peak || Spacewatch || FLO || align=right data-sort-value="0.64" | 640 m || 
|-id=751 bgcolor=#fefefe
| 352751 ||  || — || October 7, 2008 || Mount Lemmon || Mount Lemmon Survey || — || align=right | 1.8 km || 
|-id=752 bgcolor=#fefefe
| 352752 ||  || — || October 7, 2008 || Kitt Peak || Spacewatch || — || align=right data-sort-value="0.78" | 780 m || 
|-id=753 bgcolor=#fefefe
| 352753 ||  || — || October 8, 2008 || Mount Lemmon || Mount Lemmon Survey || — || align=right data-sort-value="0.75" | 750 m || 
|-id=754 bgcolor=#fefefe
| 352754 ||  || — || October 9, 2008 || Mount Lemmon || Mount Lemmon Survey || — || align=right data-sort-value="0.65" | 650 m || 
|-id=755 bgcolor=#fefefe
| 352755 ||  || — || October 2, 2008 || Kitt Peak || Spacewatch || MAS || align=right data-sort-value="0.67" | 670 m || 
|-id=756 bgcolor=#fefefe
| 352756 ||  || — || October 8, 2008 || Mount Lemmon || Mount Lemmon Survey || — || align=right data-sort-value="0.71" | 710 m || 
|-id=757 bgcolor=#fefefe
| 352757 ||  || — || October 8, 2008 || Kitt Peak || Spacewatch || — || align=right data-sort-value="0.63" | 630 m || 
|-id=758 bgcolor=#fefefe
| 352758 ||  || — || October 1, 2008 || Catalina || CSS || V || align=right data-sort-value="0.92" | 920 m || 
|-id=759 bgcolor=#fefefe
| 352759 ||  || — || October 1, 2008 || Catalina || CSS || — || align=right | 1.1 km || 
|-id=760 bgcolor=#fefefe
| 352760 Tesorero ||  ||  || October 24, 2008 || La Cañada || J. Lacruz || NYS || align=right data-sort-value="0.66" | 660 m || 
|-id=761 bgcolor=#fefefe
| 352761 ||  || — || October 25, 2008 || Socorro || LINEAR || — || align=right | 1.2 km || 
|-id=762 bgcolor=#fefefe
| 352762 ||  || — || October 24, 2008 || Catalina || CSS || — || align=right | 2.0 km || 
|-id=763 bgcolor=#fefefe
| 352763 ||  || — || September 6, 2008 || Siding Spring || SSS || — || align=right | 2.0 km || 
|-id=764 bgcolor=#fefefe
| 352764 ||  || — || October 18, 2008 || Kitt Peak || Spacewatch || — || align=right | 1.1 km || 
|-id=765 bgcolor=#fefefe
| 352765 ||  || — || October 18, 2008 || Kitt Peak || Spacewatch || — || align=right data-sort-value="0.66" | 660 m || 
|-id=766 bgcolor=#fefefe
| 352766 ||  || — || October 20, 2008 || Kitt Peak || Spacewatch || MAS || align=right data-sort-value="0.78" | 780 m || 
|-id=767 bgcolor=#fefefe
| 352767 ||  || — || October 20, 2008 || Mount Lemmon || Mount Lemmon Survey || FLO || align=right data-sort-value="0.77" | 770 m || 
|-id=768 bgcolor=#fefefe
| 352768 ||  || — || October 20, 2008 || Kitt Peak || Spacewatch || MAS || align=right data-sort-value="0.74" | 740 m || 
|-id=769 bgcolor=#fefefe
| 352769 ||  || — || October 20, 2008 || Kitt Peak || Spacewatch || ERI || align=right | 1.9 km || 
|-id=770 bgcolor=#fefefe
| 352770 ||  || — || October 20, 2008 || Kitt Peak || Spacewatch || NYS || align=right data-sort-value="0.66" | 660 m || 
|-id=771 bgcolor=#fefefe
| 352771 ||  || — || October 20, 2008 || Kitt Peak || Spacewatch || — || align=right data-sort-value="0.84" | 840 m || 
|-id=772 bgcolor=#fefefe
| 352772 ||  || — || October 20, 2008 || Mount Lemmon || Mount Lemmon Survey || MAS || align=right data-sort-value="0.68" | 680 m || 
|-id=773 bgcolor=#E9E9E9
| 352773 ||  || — || October 20, 2008 || Mount Lemmon || Mount Lemmon Survey || — || align=right | 3.1 km || 
|-id=774 bgcolor=#fefefe
| 352774 ||  || — || October 21, 2008 || Kitt Peak || Spacewatch || FLO || align=right data-sort-value="0.64" | 640 m || 
|-id=775 bgcolor=#fefefe
| 352775 ||  || — || October 21, 2008 || Mount Lemmon || Mount Lemmon Survey || — || align=right data-sort-value="0.76" | 760 m || 
|-id=776 bgcolor=#fefefe
| 352776 ||  || — || October 21, 2008 || Kitt Peak || Spacewatch || V || align=right data-sort-value="0.84" | 840 m || 
|-id=777 bgcolor=#fefefe
| 352777 ||  || — || October 21, 2008 || Mount Lemmon || Mount Lemmon Survey || — || align=right | 1.8 km || 
|-id=778 bgcolor=#fefefe
| 352778 ||  || — || October 21, 2008 || Kitt Peak || Spacewatch || — || align=right | 1.1 km || 
|-id=779 bgcolor=#fefefe
| 352779 ||  || — || October 21, 2008 || Kitt Peak || Spacewatch || — || align=right | 1.2 km || 
|-id=780 bgcolor=#fefefe
| 352780 ||  || — || October 22, 2008 || Kitt Peak || Spacewatch || NYS || align=right data-sort-value="0.60" | 600 m || 
|-id=781 bgcolor=#fefefe
| 352781 ||  || — || October 24, 2008 || Mount Lemmon || Mount Lemmon Survey || MAS || align=right data-sort-value="0.78" | 780 m || 
|-id=782 bgcolor=#fefefe
| 352782 ||  || — || December 1, 2005 || Kitt Peak || M. W. Buie || FLO || align=right data-sort-value="0.71" | 710 m || 
|-id=783 bgcolor=#fefefe
| 352783 ||  || — || October 26, 2008 || Socorro || LINEAR || FLO || align=right data-sort-value="0.74" | 740 m || 
|-id=784 bgcolor=#E9E9E9
| 352784 ||  || — || October 22, 2008 || Kitt Peak || Spacewatch || — || align=right | 3.6 km || 
|-id=785 bgcolor=#fefefe
| 352785 ||  || — || October 22, 2008 || Kitt Peak || Spacewatch || NYS || align=right data-sort-value="0.65" | 650 m || 
|-id=786 bgcolor=#fefefe
| 352786 ||  || — || October 22, 2008 || Kitt Peak || Spacewatch || — || align=right data-sort-value="0.90" | 900 m || 
|-id=787 bgcolor=#fefefe
| 352787 ||  || — || October 22, 2008 || Kitt Peak || Spacewatch || — || align=right data-sort-value="0.89" | 890 m || 
|-id=788 bgcolor=#fefefe
| 352788 ||  || — || October 23, 2008 || Kitt Peak || Spacewatch || MAS || align=right data-sort-value="0.67" | 670 m || 
|-id=789 bgcolor=#fefefe
| 352789 ||  || — || October 23, 2008 || Kitt Peak || Spacewatch || MAS || align=right data-sort-value="0.81" | 810 m || 
|-id=790 bgcolor=#fefefe
| 352790 ||  || — || October 24, 2008 || Kitt Peak || Spacewatch || FLO || align=right data-sort-value="0.67" | 670 m || 
|-id=791 bgcolor=#fefefe
| 352791 ||  || — || October 24, 2008 || Kitt Peak || Spacewatch || — || align=right data-sort-value="0.95" | 950 m || 
|-id=792 bgcolor=#fefefe
| 352792 ||  || — || October 24, 2008 || Kitt Peak || Spacewatch || V || align=right data-sort-value="0.78" | 780 m || 
|-id=793 bgcolor=#C2FFFF
| 352793 ||  || — || October 25, 2008 || Mount Lemmon || Mount Lemmon Survey || L4ERY || align=right | 8.3 km || 
|-id=794 bgcolor=#fefefe
| 352794 ||  || — || October 27, 2008 || Kitt Peak || Spacewatch || NYS || align=right data-sort-value="0.62" | 620 m || 
|-id=795 bgcolor=#fefefe
| 352795 ||  || — || October 27, 2008 || Socorro || LINEAR || NYS || align=right data-sort-value="0.79" | 790 m || 
|-id=796 bgcolor=#fefefe
| 352796 ||  || — || October 27, 2008 || Socorro || LINEAR || — || align=right | 1.2 km || 
|-id=797 bgcolor=#fefefe
| 352797 ||  || — || October 27, 2008 || Socorro || LINEAR || V || align=right data-sort-value="0.74" | 740 m || 
|-id=798 bgcolor=#fefefe
| 352798 ||  || — || October 24, 2008 || Catalina || CSS || — || align=right | 1.0 km || 
|-id=799 bgcolor=#fefefe
| 352799 ||  || — || October 24, 2008 || Kitt Peak || Spacewatch || V || align=right data-sort-value="0.93" | 930 m || 
|-id=800 bgcolor=#fefefe
| 352800 ||  || — || October 25, 2008 || Kitt Peak || Spacewatch || V || align=right data-sort-value="0.71" | 710 m || 
|}

352801–352900 

|-bgcolor=#fefefe
| 352801 ||  || — || October 25, 2008 || Kitt Peak || Spacewatch || NYS || align=right data-sort-value="0.56" | 560 m || 
|-id=802 bgcolor=#fefefe
| 352802 ||  || — || October 25, 2008 || Kitt Peak || Spacewatch || — || align=right data-sort-value="0.75" | 750 m || 
|-id=803 bgcolor=#fefefe
| 352803 ||  || — || October 26, 2008 || Kitt Peak || Spacewatch || FLO || align=right data-sort-value="0.61" | 610 m || 
|-id=804 bgcolor=#fefefe
| 352804 ||  || — || October 26, 2008 || Kitt Peak || Spacewatch || — || align=right data-sort-value="0.89" | 890 m || 
|-id=805 bgcolor=#E9E9E9
| 352805 ||  || — || October 26, 2008 || Mount Lemmon || Mount Lemmon Survey || — || align=right | 1.7 km || 
|-id=806 bgcolor=#fefefe
| 352806 ||  || — || October 26, 2008 || Kitt Peak || Spacewatch || — || align=right | 1.1 km || 
|-id=807 bgcolor=#fefefe
| 352807 ||  || — || October 27, 2008 || Kitt Peak || Spacewatch || NYS || align=right data-sort-value="0.69" | 690 m || 
|-id=808 bgcolor=#fefefe
| 352808 ||  || — || October 27, 2008 || Kitt Peak || Spacewatch || — || align=right data-sort-value="0.99" | 990 m || 
|-id=809 bgcolor=#fefefe
| 352809 ||  || — || October 28, 2008 || Mount Lemmon || Mount Lemmon Survey || — || align=right data-sort-value="0.84" | 840 m || 
|-id=810 bgcolor=#fefefe
| 352810 ||  || — || October 23, 2008 || Kitt Peak || Spacewatch || — || align=right | 1.2 km || 
|-id=811 bgcolor=#fefefe
| 352811 ||  || — || October 28, 2008 || Mount Lemmon || Mount Lemmon Survey || NYS || align=right | 1.4 km || 
|-id=812 bgcolor=#fefefe
| 352812 ||  || — || October 28, 2008 || Mount Lemmon || Mount Lemmon Survey || — || align=right data-sort-value="0.90" | 900 m || 
|-id=813 bgcolor=#fefefe
| 352813 ||  || — || October 28, 2008 || Kitt Peak || Spacewatch || MAS || align=right data-sort-value="0.71" | 710 m || 
|-id=814 bgcolor=#fefefe
| 352814 ||  || — || October 28, 2008 || Mount Lemmon || Mount Lemmon Survey || NYS || align=right data-sort-value="0.62" | 620 m || 
|-id=815 bgcolor=#fefefe
| 352815 ||  || — || October 28, 2008 || Mount Lemmon || Mount Lemmon Survey || — || align=right data-sort-value="0.85" | 850 m || 
|-id=816 bgcolor=#fefefe
| 352816 ||  || — || October 29, 2008 || Kitt Peak || Spacewatch || NYS || align=right data-sort-value="0.58" | 580 m || 
|-id=817 bgcolor=#fefefe
| 352817 ||  || — || September 29, 2008 || Kitt Peak || Spacewatch || FLO || align=right data-sort-value="0.58" | 580 m || 
|-id=818 bgcolor=#fefefe
| 352818 ||  || — || October 30, 2008 || Catalina || CSS || V || align=right data-sort-value="0.72" | 720 m || 
|-id=819 bgcolor=#E9E9E9
| 352819 ||  || — || October 30, 2008 || Kitt Peak || Spacewatch || — || align=right | 2.3 km || 
|-id=820 bgcolor=#fefefe
| 352820 ||  || — || October 30, 2008 || Mount Lemmon || Mount Lemmon Survey || FLO || align=right data-sort-value="0.75" | 750 m || 
|-id=821 bgcolor=#fefefe
| 352821 ||  || — || October 31, 2008 || Kitt Peak || Spacewatch || NYS || align=right data-sort-value="0.58" | 580 m || 
|-id=822 bgcolor=#E9E9E9
| 352822 ||  || — || October 31, 2008 || Mount Lemmon || Mount Lemmon Survey || ADE || align=right | 3.1 km || 
|-id=823 bgcolor=#fefefe
| 352823 ||  || — || October 31, 2008 || Kitt Peak || Spacewatch || — || align=right data-sort-value="0.91" | 910 m || 
|-id=824 bgcolor=#fefefe
| 352824 ||  || — || October 31, 2008 || Mount Lemmon || Mount Lemmon Survey || FLO || align=right data-sort-value="0.65" | 650 m || 
|-id=825 bgcolor=#fefefe
| 352825 ||  || — || October 23, 2008 || Kitt Peak || Spacewatch || NYS || align=right data-sort-value="0.63" | 630 m || 
|-id=826 bgcolor=#fefefe
| 352826 ||  || — || October 24, 2008 || Catalina || CSS || — || align=right | 1.2 km || 
|-id=827 bgcolor=#fefefe
| 352827 ||  || — || October 21, 2008 || Kitt Peak || Spacewatch || — || align=right data-sort-value="0.86" | 860 m || 
|-id=828 bgcolor=#fefefe
| 352828 ||  || — || October 27, 2008 || Kitt Peak || Spacewatch || V || align=right data-sort-value="0.68" | 680 m || 
|-id=829 bgcolor=#fefefe
| 352829 ||  || — || October 27, 2008 || Mount Lemmon || Mount Lemmon Survey || V || align=right data-sort-value="0.76" | 760 m || 
|-id=830 bgcolor=#fefefe
| 352830 ||  || — || October 29, 2008 || Kitt Peak || Spacewatch || — || align=right data-sort-value="0.80" | 800 m || 
|-id=831 bgcolor=#E9E9E9
| 352831 ||  || — || October 25, 2008 || Mount Lemmon || Mount Lemmon Survey || — || align=right | 1.2 km || 
|-id=832 bgcolor=#fefefe
| 352832 ||  || — || October 20, 2008 || Kitt Peak || Spacewatch || MAS || align=right data-sort-value="0.71" | 710 m || 
|-id=833 bgcolor=#E9E9E9
| 352833 ||  || — || August 7, 2008 || Kitt Peak || Spacewatch || MAR || align=right | 1.5 km || 
|-id=834 bgcolor=#fefefe
| 352834 Málaga ||  ||  || November 6, 2008 || Málaga || J. M. Ruiz, G. Muler || — || align=right data-sort-value="0.94" | 940 m || 
|-id=835 bgcolor=#fefefe
| 352835 ||  || — || November 6, 2008 || Ondřejov || Ondřejov Obs. || ERI || align=right | 1.9 km || 
|-id=836 bgcolor=#E9E9E9
| 352836 ||  || — || November 10, 2008 || La Sagra || OAM Obs. || — || align=right | 2.8 km || 
|-id=837 bgcolor=#fefefe
| 352837 ||  || — || November 1, 2008 || Kitt Peak || Spacewatch || — || align=right data-sort-value="0.75" | 750 m || 
|-id=838 bgcolor=#fefefe
| 352838 ||  || — || November 4, 2008 || Catalina || CSS || MAS || align=right data-sort-value="0.78" | 780 m || 
|-id=839 bgcolor=#E9E9E9
| 352839 ||  || — || November 7, 2008 || Mount Lemmon || Mount Lemmon Survey || — || align=right | 1.4 km || 
|-id=840 bgcolor=#E9E9E9
| 352840 ||  || — || November 8, 2008 || Mount Lemmon || Mount Lemmon Survey || — || align=right | 1.2 km || 
|-id=841 bgcolor=#E9E9E9
| 352841 ||  || — || November 8, 2008 || Mount Lemmon || Mount Lemmon Survey || — || align=right | 1.5 km || 
|-id=842 bgcolor=#fefefe
| 352842 ||  || — || November 1, 2008 || Mount Lemmon || Mount Lemmon Survey || — || align=right | 1.1 km || 
|-id=843 bgcolor=#fefefe
| 352843 ||  || — || November 6, 2008 || Mount Lemmon || Mount Lemmon Survey || ERI || align=right | 1.5 km || 
|-id=844 bgcolor=#E9E9E9
| 352844 ||  || — || November 8, 2008 || Mount Lemmon || Mount Lemmon Survey || — || align=right | 2.9 km || 
|-id=845 bgcolor=#fefefe
| 352845 ||  || — || November 7, 2008 || Mount Lemmon || Mount Lemmon Survey || — || align=right | 1.1 km || 
|-id=846 bgcolor=#fefefe
| 352846 ||  || — || November 18, 2008 || Catalina || CSS || MAS || align=right data-sort-value="0.62" | 620 m || 
|-id=847 bgcolor=#E9E9E9
| 352847 ||  || — || December 3, 2004 || Eskridge || G. Hug || — || align=right data-sort-value="0.99" | 990 m || 
|-id=848 bgcolor=#fefefe
| 352848 ||  || — || November 18, 2008 || Catalina || CSS || — || align=right | 2.2 km || 
|-id=849 bgcolor=#fefefe
| 352849 ||  || — || November 18, 2008 || Catalina || CSS || — || align=right data-sort-value="0.86" | 860 m || 
|-id=850 bgcolor=#fefefe
| 352850 ||  || — || November 18, 2008 || Catalina || CSS || NYS || align=right data-sort-value="0.64" | 640 m || 
|-id=851 bgcolor=#fefefe
| 352851 ||  || — || November 19, 2008 || Mount Lemmon || Mount Lemmon Survey || NYS || align=right data-sort-value="0.69" | 690 m || 
|-id=852 bgcolor=#fefefe
| 352852 ||  || — || November 17, 2008 || Kitt Peak || Spacewatch || V || align=right data-sort-value="0.66" | 660 m || 
|-id=853 bgcolor=#fefefe
| 352853 ||  || — || November 20, 2008 || Socorro || LINEAR || — || align=right data-sort-value="0.98" | 980 m || 
|-id=854 bgcolor=#fefefe
| 352854 ||  || — || November 21, 2008 || Mount Lemmon || Mount Lemmon Survey || V || align=right data-sort-value="0.67" | 670 m || 
|-id=855 bgcolor=#fefefe
| 352855 ||  || — || November 18, 2008 || Catalina || CSS || NYS || align=right data-sort-value="0.76" | 760 m || 
|-id=856 bgcolor=#fefefe
| 352856 ||  || — || November 18, 2008 || Kitt Peak || Spacewatch || — || align=right | 1.1 km || 
|-id=857 bgcolor=#E9E9E9
| 352857 ||  || — || November 20, 2008 || Kitt Peak || Spacewatch || — || align=right | 1.7 km || 
|-id=858 bgcolor=#fefefe
| 352858 ||  || — || November 20, 2008 || Kitt Peak || Spacewatch || — || align=right | 1.1 km || 
|-id=859 bgcolor=#fefefe
| 352859 ||  || — || November 20, 2008 || Kitt Peak || Spacewatch || NYS || align=right data-sort-value="0.87" | 870 m || 
|-id=860 bgcolor=#fefefe
| 352860 Monflier ||  ||  || November 30, 2008 || Vicques || M. Ory || NYS || align=right data-sort-value="0.80" | 800 m || 
|-id=861 bgcolor=#E9E9E9
| 352861 ||  || — || November 19, 2008 || Catalina || CSS || — || align=right | 1.4 km || 
|-id=862 bgcolor=#fefefe
| 352862 ||  || — || November 30, 2008 || Kitt Peak || Spacewatch || V || align=right data-sort-value="0.65" | 650 m || 
|-id=863 bgcolor=#fefefe
| 352863 ||  || — || September 28, 2000 || Kitt Peak || Spacewatch || NYS || align=right data-sort-value="0.87" | 870 m || 
|-id=864 bgcolor=#fefefe
| 352864 ||  || — || November 30, 2008 || Mount Lemmon || Mount Lemmon Survey || V || align=right data-sort-value="0.81" | 810 m || 
|-id=865 bgcolor=#fefefe
| 352865 ||  || — || November 30, 2008 || Kitt Peak || Spacewatch || — || align=right | 1.1 km || 
|-id=866 bgcolor=#E9E9E9
| 352866 ||  || — || November 30, 2008 || Kitt Peak || Spacewatch || — || align=right | 1.1 km || 
|-id=867 bgcolor=#fefefe
| 352867 ||  || — || November 19, 2008 || Mount Lemmon || Mount Lemmon Survey || NYS || align=right data-sort-value="0.81" | 810 m || 
|-id=868 bgcolor=#fefefe
| 352868 ||  || — || November 30, 2008 || Socorro || LINEAR || V || align=right data-sort-value="0.78" | 780 m || 
|-id=869 bgcolor=#fefefe
| 352869 ||  || — || November 18, 2008 || Catalina || CSS || LCI || align=right | 1.4 km || 
|-id=870 bgcolor=#E9E9E9
| 352870 ||  || — || December 2, 2008 || Socorro || LINEAR || — || align=right | 1.8 km || 
|-id=871 bgcolor=#fefefe
| 352871 ||  || — || December 1, 2008 || Catalina || CSS || — || align=right data-sort-value="0.98" | 980 m || 
|-id=872 bgcolor=#E9E9E9
| 352872 ||  || — || December 1, 2008 || Kitt Peak || Spacewatch || JUN || align=right | 1.1 km || 
|-id=873 bgcolor=#fefefe
| 352873 ||  || — || October 22, 2008 || Kitt Peak || Spacewatch || V || align=right data-sort-value="0.89" | 890 m || 
|-id=874 bgcolor=#fefefe
| 352874 ||  || — || December 2, 2008 || Kitt Peak || Spacewatch || V || align=right data-sort-value="0.62" | 620 m || 
|-id=875 bgcolor=#E9E9E9
| 352875 ||  || — || December 2, 2008 || Kitt Peak || Spacewatch || — || align=right | 1.2 km || 
|-id=876 bgcolor=#E9E9E9
| 352876 ||  || — || December 2, 2008 || Kitt Peak || Spacewatch || — || align=right | 2.3 km || 
|-id=877 bgcolor=#E9E9E9
| 352877 ||  || — || December 4, 2008 || Mount Lemmon || Mount Lemmon Survey || — || align=right data-sort-value="0.94" | 940 m || 
|-id=878 bgcolor=#E9E9E9
| 352878 ||  || — || December 4, 2008 || Mount Lemmon || Mount Lemmon Survey || — || align=right | 1.4 km || 
|-id=879 bgcolor=#E9E9E9
| 352879 ||  || — || September 16, 2003 || Kitt Peak || Spacewatch || — || align=right | 1.3 km || 
|-id=880 bgcolor=#E9E9E9
| 352880 ||  || — || December 22, 2008 || Socorro || LINEAR || GAL || align=right | 2.7 km || 
|-id=881 bgcolor=#fefefe
| 352881 ||  || — || December 21, 2008 || Calar Alto || F. Hormuth || — || align=right | 2.1 km || 
|-id=882 bgcolor=#E9E9E9
| 352882 ||  || — || December 22, 2008 || Dauban || F. Kugel || — || align=right | 1.1 km || 
|-id=883 bgcolor=#fefefe
| 352883 ||  || — || December 23, 2008 || Dauban || F. Kugel || — || align=right data-sort-value="0.90" | 900 m || 
|-id=884 bgcolor=#fefefe
| 352884 ||  || — || December 20, 2008 || Mount Lemmon || Mount Lemmon Survey || KLI || align=right | 1.9 km || 
|-id=885 bgcolor=#E9E9E9
| 352885 ||  || — || December 21, 2008 || Mount Lemmon || Mount Lemmon Survey || — || align=right | 1.8 km || 
|-id=886 bgcolor=#E9E9E9
| 352886 ||  || — || December 21, 2008 || Mount Lemmon || Mount Lemmon Survey || — || align=right | 1.1 km || 
|-id=887 bgcolor=#fefefe
| 352887 ||  || — || December 30, 2008 || Piszkéstető || K. Sárneczky || — || align=right data-sort-value="0.94" | 940 m || 
|-id=888 bgcolor=#E9E9E9
| 352888 ||  || — || December 31, 2008 || Bergisch Gladbac || W. Bickel || — || align=right | 1.0 km || 
|-id=889 bgcolor=#E9E9E9
| 352889 ||  || — || December 22, 2008 || Mount Lemmon || Mount Lemmon Survey || — || align=right | 2.6 km || 
|-id=890 bgcolor=#E9E9E9
| 352890 ||  || — || December 22, 2008 || Kitt Peak || Spacewatch || — || align=right | 1.4 km || 
|-id=891 bgcolor=#fefefe
| 352891 ||  || — || December 29, 2008 || Kitt Peak || Spacewatch || — || align=right data-sort-value="0.86" | 860 m || 
|-id=892 bgcolor=#E9E9E9
| 352892 ||  || — || December 29, 2008 || Mount Lemmon || Mount Lemmon Survey || — || align=right | 1.3 km || 
|-id=893 bgcolor=#E9E9E9
| 352893 ||  || — || December 29, 2008 || Mount Lemmon || Mount Lemmon Survey || PAD || align=right | 1.8 km || 
|-id=894 bgcolor=#E9E9E9
| 352894 ||  || — || December 29, 2008 || Mount Lemmon || Mount Lemmon Survey || — || align=right | 2.1 km || 
|-id=895 bgcolor=#E9E9E9
| 352895 ||  || — || October 20, 2003 || Kitt Peak || Spacewatch || — || align=right | 1.5 km || 
|-id=896 bgcolor=#E9E9E9
| 352896 ||  || — || December 30, 2008 || Mount Lemmon || Mount Lemmon Survey || — || align=right | 1.4 km || 
|-id=897 bgcolor=#fefefe
| 352897 ||  || — || December 30, 2008 || Mount Lemmon || Mount Lemmon Survey || — || align=right data-sort-value="0.97" | 970 m || 
|-id=898 bgcolor=#E9E9E9
| 352898 ||  || — || December 29, 2008 || Kitt Peak || Spacewatch || — || align=right | 2.2 km || 
|-id=899 bgcolor=#E9E9E9
| 352899 ||  || — || December 30, 2008 || Mount Lemmon || Mount Lemmon Survey || — || align=right | 1.0 km || 
|-id=900 bgcolor=#E9E9E9
| 352900 ||  || — || December 31, 2008 || Kitt Peak || Spacewatch || — || align=right data-sort-value="0.99" | 990 m || 
|}

352901–353000 

|-bgcolor=#fefefe
| 352901 ||  || — || December 29, 2008 || Mount Lemmon || Mount Lemmon Survey || — || align=right | 1.0 km || 
|-id=902 bgcolor=#fefefe
| 352902 ||  || — || December 29, 2008 || Kitt Peak || Spacewatch || — || align=right | 1.0 km || 
|-id=903 bgcolor=#fefefe
| 352903 ||  || — || December 29, 2008 || Kitt Peak || Spacewatch || V || align=right data-sort-value="0.82" | 820 m || 
|-id=904 bgcolor=#fefefe
| 352904 ||  || — || July 3, 2003 || Kitt Peak || Spacewatch || LCI || align=right data-sort-value="0.86" | 860 m || 
|-id=905 bgcolor=#E9E9E9
| 352905 ||  || — || December 29, 2008 || Kitt Peak || Spacewatch || — || align=right | 2.9 km || 
|-id=906 bgcolor=#E9E9E9
| 352906 ||  || — || December 29, 2008 || Kitt Peak || Spacewatch || — || align=right | 1.2 km || 
|-id=907 bgcolor=#E9E9E9
| 352907 ||  || — || December 29, 2008 || Kitt Peak || Spacewatch || — || align=right | 1.2 km || 
|-id=908 bgcolor=#E9E9E9
| 352908 ||  || — || December 29, 2008 || Kitt Peak || Spacewatch || — || align=right | 2.0 km || 
|-id=909 bgcolor=#fefefe
| 352909 ||  || — || December 30, 2008 || Kitt Peak || Spacewatch || — || align=right | 1.3 km || 
|-id=910 bgcolor=#E9E9E9
| 352910 ||  || — || December 30, 2008 || Kitt Peak || Spacewatch || — || align=right | 2.5 km || 
|-id=911 bgcolor=#E9E9E9
| 352911 ||  || — || December 30, 2008 || Kitt Peak || Spacewatch || — || align=right | 1.5 km || 
|-id=912 bgcolor=#fefefe
| 352912 ||  || — || December 30, 2008 || Kitt Peak || Spacewatch || — || align=right | 1.1 km || 
|-id=913 bgcolor=#E9E9E9
| 352913 ||  || — || December 30, 2008 || Mount Lemmon || Mount Lemmon Survey || — || align=right | 2.0 km || 
|-id=914 bgcolor=#fefefe
| 352914 ||  || — || December 30, 2008 || Kitt Peak || Spacewatch || NYS || align=right data-sort-value="0.85" | 850 m || 
|-id=915 bgcolor=#E9E9E9
| 352915 ||  || — || December 30, 2008 || Kitt Peak || Spacewatch || — || align=right | 1.8 km || 
|-id=916 bgcolor=#E9E9E9
| 352916 ||  || — || December 30, 2008 || Kitt Peak || Spacewatch || — || align=right | 1.6 km || 
|-id=917 bgcolor=#E9E9E9
| 352917 ||  || — || December 30, 2008 || Kitt Peak || Spacewatch || — || align=right | 1.6 km || 
|-id=918 bgcolor=#E9E9E9
| 352918 ||  || — || December 21, 2008 || Catalina || CSS || BRG || align=right | 2.1 km || 
|-id=919 bgcolor=#fefefe
| 352919 ||  || — || December 23, 2008 || Piszkéstető || K. Sárneczky || MAS || align=right data-sort-value="0.86" | 860 m || 
|-id=920 bgcolor=#E9E9E9
| 352920 ||  || — || December 29, 2008 || Mount Lemmon || Mount Lemmon Survey || HNS || align=right | 1.4 km || 
|-id=921 bgcolor=#E9E9E9
| 352921 ||  || — || December 22, 2008 || Mount Lemmon || Mount Lemmon Survey || — || align=right | 1.3 km || 
|-id=922 bgcolor=#E9E9E9
| 352922 ||  || — || December 31, 2008 || Catalina || CSS || RAF || align=right | 1.1 km || 
|-id=923 bgcolor=#E9E9E9
| 352923 ||  || — || December 19, 2008 || Socorro || LINEAR || — || align=right | 1.7 km || 
|-id=924 bgcolor=#fefefe
| 352924 ||  || — || December 22, 2008 || Mount Lemmon || Mount Lemmon Survey || MAS || align=right data-sort-value="0.82" | 820 m || 
|-id=925 bgcolor=#E9E9E9
| 352925 ||  || — || December 30, 2008 || Mount Lemmon || Mount Lemmon Survey || — || align=right | 2.0 km || 
|-id=926 bgcolor=#E9E9E9
| 352926 ||  || — || December 22, 2008 || Kitt Peak || Spacewatch || ADE || align=right | 2.6 km || 
|-id=927 bgcolor=#E9E9E9
| 352927 ||  || — || December 28, 2008 || Socorro || LINEAR || — || align=right data-sort-value="0.88" | 880 m || 
|-id=928 bgcolor=#E9E9E9
| 352928 ||  || — || January 6, 2009 || Great Shefford || P. Birtwhistle || — || align=right | 1.2 km || 
|-id=929 bgcolor=#E9E9E9
| 352929 ||  || — || January 2, 2009 || Mount Lemmon || Mount Lemmon Survey || — || align=right data-sort-value="0.99" | 990 m || 
|-id=930 bgcolor=#E9E9E9
| 352930 ||  || — || January 3, 2009 || Kitt Peak || Spacewatch || — || align=right data-sort-value="0.92" | 920 m || 
|-id=931 bgcolor=#E9E9E9
| 352931 ||  || — || January 2, 2009 || Kitt Peak || Spacewatch || — || align=right | 1.6 km || 
|-id=932 bgcolor=#E9E9E9
| 352932 ||  || — || January 2, 2009 || Kitt Peak || Spacewatch || HEN || align=right | 1.3 km || 
|-id=933 bgcolor=#E9E9E9
| 352933 ||  || — || January 8, 2009 || Kitt Peak || Spacewatch || ADE || align=right | 2.8 km || 
|-id=934 bgcolor=#fefefe
| 352934 ||  || — || January 1, 2009 || Kitt Peak || Spacewatch || — || align=right | 1.5 km || 
|-id=935 bgcolor=#E9E9E9
| 352935 ||  || — || January 15, 2009 || Kitt Peak || Spacewatch || — || align=right | 1.2 km || 
|-id=936 bgcolor=#E9E9E9
| 352936 ||  || — || January 15, 2009 || Kitt Peak || Spacewatch || — || align=right data-sort-value="0.82" | 820 m || 
|-id=937 bgcolor=#E9E9E9
| 352937 ||  || — || January 15, 2009 || Kitt Peak || Spacewatch || — || align=right | 1.1 km || 
|-id=938 bgcolor=#E9E9E9
| 352938 ||  || — || January 3, 2009 || Mount Lemmon || Mount Lemmon Survey || — || align=right | 1.3 km || 
|-id=939 bgcolor=#E9E9E9
| 352939 ||  || — || January 2, 2009 || Catalina || CSS || — || align=right | 1.4 km || 
|-id=940 bgcolor=#E9E9E9
| 352940 ||  || — || January 15, 2009 || Kitt Peak || Spacewatch || — || align=right | 1.7 km || 
|-id=941 bgcolor=#E9E9E9
| 352941 ||  || — || January 15, 2009 || Kitt Peak || Spacewatch || — || align=right data-sort-value="0.76" | 760 m || 
|-id=942 bgcolor=#E9E9E9
| 352942 ||  || — || December 20, 2004 || Mount Lemmon || Mount Lemmon Survey || — || align=right data-sort-value="0.92" | 920 m || 
|-id=943 bgcolor=#E9E9E9
| 352943 ||  || — || November 23, 2008 || Mount Lemmon || Mount Lemmon Survey || GER || align=right | 1.6 km || 
|-id=944 bgcolor=#E9E9E9
| 352944 ||  || — || May 2, 2006 || Mount Lemmon || Mount Lemmon Survey || — || align=right | 1.2 km || 
|-id=945 bgcolor=#E9E9E9
| 352945 ||  || — || January 21, 2009 || Tzec Maun || E. Schwab || — || align=right | 1.6 km || 
|-id=946 bgcolor=#E9E9E9
| 352946 ||  || — || January 20, 2009 || Socorro || LINEAR || — || align=right | 2.3 km || 
|-id=947 bgcolor=#E9E9E9
| 352947 ||  || — || January 21, 2009 || Socorro || LINEAR || HNS || align=right | 1.5 km || 
|-id=948 bgcolor=#E9E9E9
| 352948 ||  || — || January 22, 2009 || Socorro || LINEAR || — || align=right | 4.3 km || 
|-id=949 bgcolor=#fefefe
| 352949 ||  || — || January 16, 2009 || Mount Lemmon || Mount Lemmon Survey || V || align=right data-sort-value="0.70" | 700 m || 
|-id=950 bgcolor=#E9E9E9
| 352950 ||  || — || January 17, 2009 || Catalina || CSS || EUN || align=right | 1.3 km || 
|-id=951 bgcolor=#E9E9E9
| 352951 ||  || — || January 16, 2009 || Mount Lemmon || Mount Lemmon Survey || — || align=right | 1.1 km || 
|-id=952 bgcolor=#E9E9E9
| 352952 ||  || — || January 1, 2009 || Mount Lemmon || Mount Lemmon Survey || — || align=right | 1.5 km || 
|-id=953 bgcolor=#E9E9E9
| 352953 ||  || — || November 2, 2007 || Catalina || CSS || — || align=right | 2.8 km || 
|-id=954 bgcolor=#E9E9E9
| 352954 ||  || — || January 17, 2009 || Kitt Peak || Spacewatch || — || align=right | 1.0 km || 
|-id=955 bgcolor=#E9E9E9
| 352955 ||  || — || January 16, 2009 || Kitt Peak || Spacewatch || — || align=right | 1.0 km || 
|-id=956 bgcolor=#E9E9E9
| 352956 ||  || — || January 16, 2009 || Kitt Peak || Spacewatch || NEM || align=right | 2.7 km || 
|-id=957 bgcolor=#E9E9E9
| 352957 ||  || — || January 16, 2009 || Kitt Peak || Spacewatch || — || align=right | 1.2 km || 
|-id=958 bgcolor=#E9E9E9
| 352958 ||  || — || January 16, 2009 || Kitt Peak || Spacewatch || XIZ || align=right | 1.2 km || 
|-id=959 bgcolor=#E9E9E9
| 352959 ||  || — || January 16, 2009 || Kitt Peak || Spacewatch || — || align=right | 1.5 km || 
|-id=960 bgcolor=#E9E9E9
| 352960 ||  || — || January 16, 2009 || Kitt Peak || Spacewatch || — || align=right | 1.00 km || 
|-id=961 bgcolor=#E9E9E9
| 352961 ||  || — || January 16, 2009 || Kitt Peak || Spacewatch || — || align=right | 1.3 km || 
|-id=962 bgcolor=#E9E9E9
| 352962 ||  || — || January 16, 2009 || Kitt Peak || Spacewatch || — || align=right | 1.9 km || 
|-id=963 bgcolor=#E9E9E9
| 352963 ||  || — || January 16, 2009 || Kitt Peak || Spacewatch || — || align=right | 1.3 km || 
|-id=964 bgcolor=#E9E9E9
| 352964 ||  || — || January 16, 2009 || Mount Lemmon || Mount Lemmon Survey || — || align=right | 1.2 km || 
|-id=965 bgcolor=#E9E9E9
| 352965 ||  || — || January 16, 2009 || Kitt Peak || Spacewatch || — || align=right data-sort-value="0.79" | 790 m || 
|-id=966 bgcolor=#E9E9E9
| 352966 ||  || — || January 16, 2009 || Kitt Peak || Spacewatch || JUN || align=right data-sort-value="0.99" | 990 m || 
|-id=967 bgcolor=#E9E9E9
| 352967 ||  || — || January 16, 2009 || Mount Lemmon || Mount Lemmon Survey || — || align=right data-sort-value="0.82" | 820 m || 
|-id=968 bgcolor=#E9E9E9
| 352968 ||  || — || January 16, 2009 || Mount Lemmon || Mount Lemmon Survey || — || align=right data-sort-value="0.99" | 990 m || 
|-id=969 bgcolor=#E9E9E9
| 352969 ||  || — || January 16, 2009 || Mount Lemmon || Mount Lemmon Survey || — || align=right | 1.9 km || 
|-id=970 bgcolor=#E9E9E9
| 352970 ||  || — || January 16, 2009 || Mount Lemmon || Mount Lemmon Survey || — || align=right | 1.6 km || 
|-id=971 bgcolor=#E9E9E9
| 352971 ||  || — || January 18, 2009 || Mount Lemmon || Mount Lemmon Survey || — || align=right | 1.7 km || 
|-id=972 bgcolor=#fefefe
| 352972 ||  || — || January 20, 2009 || Catalina || CSS || — || align=right | 1.3 km || 
|-id=973 bgcolor=#E9E9E9
| 352973 ||  || — || January 20, 2009 || Catalina || CSS || — || align=right | 1.4 km || 
|-id=974 bgcolor=#E9E9E9
| 352974 ||  || — || January 20, 2009 || Kitt Peak || Spacewatch || — || align=right data-sort-value="0.81" | 810 m || 
|-id=975 bgcolor=#E9E9E9
| 352975 ||  || — || January 20, 2009 || Kitt Peak || Spacewatch || — || align=right | 1.9 km || 
|-id=976 bgcolor=#E9E9E9
| 352976 ||  || — || January 20, 2009 || Kitt Peak || Spacewatch || — || align=right | 2.0 km || 
|-id=977 bgcolor=#E9E9E9
| 352977 ||  || — || January 20, 2009 || Kitt Peak || Spacewatch || — || align=right | 1.2 km || 
|-id=978 bgcolor=#E9E9E9
| 352978 ||  || — || November 21, 2008 || Catalina || CSS || — || align=right | 1.5 km || 
|-id=979 bgcolor=#E9E9E9
| 352979 ||  || — || January 21, 2009 || Catalina || CSS || — || align=right | 2.0 km || 
|-id=980 bgcolor=#E9E9E9
| 352980 ||  || — || January 23, 2009 || Purple Mountain || PMO NEO || — || align=right | 1.3 km || 
|-id=981 bgcolor=#E9E9E9
| 352981 ||  || — || January 27, 2009 || Purple Mountain || PMO NEO || RAF || align=right | 1.3 km || 
|-id=982 bgcolor=#E9E9E9
| 352982 ||  || — || January 30, 2009 || Socorro || LINEAR || MAR || align=right | 1.4 km || 
|-id=983 bgcolor=#E9E9E9
| 352983 ||  || — || January 20, 2009 || Catalina || CSS || — || align=right | 1.4 km || 
|-id=984 bgcolor=#E9E9E9
| 352984 ||  || — || January 25, 2009 || Kitt Peak || Spacewatch || — || align=right data-sort-value="0.95" | 950 m || 
|-id=985 bgcolor=#E9E9E9
| 352985 ||  || — || January 26, 2009 || Mount Lemmon || Mount Lemmon Survey || — || align=right | 1.1 km || 
|-id=986 bgcolor=#E9E9E9
| 352986 ||  || — || January 26, 2009 || Purple Mountain || PMO NEO || — || align=right | 1.7 km || 
|-id=987 bgcolor=#E9E9E9
| 352987 ||  || — || January 28, 2009 || Catalina || CSS || ADE || align=right | 2.4 km || 
|-id=988 bgcolor=#E9E9E9
| 352988 ||  || — || January 29, 2009 || Catalina || CSS || — || align=right | 2.5 km || 
|-id=989 bgcolor=#E9E9E9
| 352989 ||  || — || January 30, 2009 || Siding Spring || SSS || — || align=right | 1.4 km || 
|-id=990 bgcolor=#E9E9E9
| 352990 ||  || — || January 25, 2009 || Kitt Peak || Spacewatch || — || align=right | 1.4 km || 
|-id=991 bgcolor=#E9E9E9
| 352991 ||  || — || January 25, 2009 || Kitt Peak || Spacewatch || IAN || align=right data-sort-value="0.94" | 940 m || 
|-id=992 bgcolor=#E9E9E9
| 352992 ||  || — || January 29, 2009 || Mount Lemmon || Mount Lemmon Survey || — || align=right | 1.7 km || 
|-id=993 bgcolor=#E9E9E9
| 352993 ||  || — || January 29, 2009 || Mount Lemmon || Mount Lemmon Survey || — || align=right | 1.5 km || 
|-id=994 bgcolor=#E9E9E9
| 352994 ||  || — || January 28, 2009 || Catalina || CSS || — || align=right | 4.3 km || 
|-id=995 bgcolor=#E9E9E9
| 352995 ||  || — || January 29, 2009 || Kitt Peak || Spacewatch || — || align=right | 3.1 km || 
|-id=996 bgcolor=#d6d6d6
| 352996 ||  || — || January 31, 2009 || Mount Lemmon || Mount Lemmon Survey || BRA || align=right | 1.5 km || 
|-id=997 bgcolor=#E9E9E9
| 352997 ||  || — || January 29, 2009 || Kitt Peak || Spacewatch || — || align=right | 1.1 km || 
|-id=998 bgcolor=#E9E9E9
| 352998 ||  || — || January 31, 2009 || Kitt Peak || Spacewatch || JUN || align=right | 1.6 km || 
|-id=999 bgcolor=#E9E9E9
| 352999 ||  || — || January 31, 2009 || Kitt Peak || Spacewatch || — || align=right | 1.3 km || 
|-id=000 bgcolor=#E9E9E9
| 353000 ||  || — || January 28, 2009 || Kitt Peak || Spacewatch || — || align=right | 1.1 km || 
|}

References

External links 
 Discovery Circumstances: Numbered Minor Planets (350001)–(355000) (IAU Minor Planet Center)

0352